The following is a partial list of products, services, and subsidiaries of International Business Machines (IBM) Corporation and its predecessor corporations, beginning in the 1890s.

This list is eclectic; it includes, for example, the AN/FSQ-7, which was not a product in the sense of offered for sale, but was a product in the sense of manufactured—produced by the labor of IBM. Several machines manufactured for the Astronomical Computing Bureau at Columbia University are included, as are some machines built only as demonstrations of IBM technology. Missing are many RPQs, OEM products (semiconductors, for example), and supplies (punched cards, for example). These products and others are missing simply because no one has added them.

IBM sometimes uses the same number for a system and for the principal component of that system. For example, the IBM 604 Calculating Unit is a component of the IBM 604 Calculating Punch. And different IBM divisions used the same model numbers; for example IBM 01 without context clues could be a reference to a keypunch or to IBM's first electric typewriter.

Number sequence may not correspond to product development sequence. For example, the 402 tabulator was an improved, modernized, 405.

IBM uses two naming structures for its modern hardware products. Products are normally given a three- or four-digit machine type and a model number (it can be a mix of letters and numbers). A product may also have a marketing or brand name. For instance, 2107 is the machine type for the IBM System Storage DS8000. While the majority of products are listed here by machine type, there are instances where only a marketing or brand name is used. Care should be taken when searching for a particular product as sometimes the type and model numbers overlap. For instance the IBM storage product known as the Enterprise Storage Server is machine type 2105, and the IBM printing product known as the IBM Infoprint 2105 is machine type 2705, so searching for an IBM 2105 could result in two different products—or the wrong product—being found.

IBM introduced the 80-column rectangular hole punched card in 1928. Pre-1928 machine models that continued in production with the new 80-column card format had the same model number as before. Machines manufactured prior to 1928 were, in some cases, retrofitted with 80-column card readers and/or punches thus there existed machines with pre-1928 dates of manufacture that contain 1928 technology.

This list is organized by classifications of both machines and applications, rather than by product name. Thus some (few) entries will be duplicated. The 1420, for example, is listed both as a member of the 1401 family and as a machine for Bank and finance.

IBM product names have varied over the years; for example these two texts both reference the same product.
 Mechanical Key Punch, Type 1 (in Machine Methods of Accounting, IBM, 1936)
 Mechanical Punch, Type 001 (in IBM Electric Punched Card Accounting Machines: Principles of Operation, IBM, 1946)
This article uses the name, or combination of names, most descriptive of the product. Thus the entry for the above is
 IBM 001: Mechanical Key Punch

Products of The Tabulating Machine Company can be identified by date, before 1933 when the subsidiaries were merged into IBM.

Unit record equipment

Keypunches and verifiers

 Hollerith Keyboard (pantograph) punch: Manual card punch, 1890
 IBM 001: Mechanical Key Punch, 1910

 IBM 003: Lever Set Gang Punch, 1920
 IBM 010: Card Punch
 IBM 011: Electric Key Punch, 1923
 IBM 012: Electric Duplicating Key Punch, 1926
 IBM 013: Badge Punch
 IBM 015: Motor Drive Key Punch, 1915
 IBM 016: Motor Drive Duplicating Key Punch, 1927
 IBM 020: Card Punch
 IBM 024: Card Punch (electronic—tube, BCD zone codes); 1949
 IBM 026: Printing Card Punch (electronic—tube, BCD zone codes); 1949
 IBM 027: Card Proof Punch, 1956
 IBM 028: Printing Card Proof Punch, 1956
 IBM 029: Card Punch (electric—diodes & relays, EBCDIC zone codes); 1964
 IBM 031: Alphabetic Duplicating Key Punch; 1933
 IBM 032: Alphabetic Printing Key Punch; 1933
 IBM 033: Alphabetic Duplicating Printing Punch
 IBM 034: Alphabetic Duplicating Printing Key Punch; 1933
 IBM 036: Alphabetic Printing Punch, 1930
 IBM 037: Alphabetic Stencil Punch
 IBM 040: Tape Controlled Card Punch; 1941
 IBM 041: Tape to Card Punch
 IBM 043: Tape Controlled Card Punch
 IBM 044: Tape Controlled Card Punch
 IBM 046: Tape-to-Card Punch
 IBM 047: Tape-to-Card Printing Punch
 IBM 051: Mechanical Verifier
 IBM 052: Motor Drive Verifier
 IBM 053: Motor Drive Verifier
 IBM 054: Motor Drive Verifier
 IBM 055: Alphabetic Verifier, 1946
 IBM 056: Card Verifier (electronic—tube, BCD zone codes); 1949
 IBM 058: Card Operated Typewriter
 IBM 059: Card Verifier (electric, diodes & relays, EBCDIC zone codes); 1964
 IBM 060: Card to Tape Punch (5 channel)
 IBM 063: Card-Controlled Tape Punch
 IBM Data Transceiver: A 65 or 66 in combination with a 67 or 68
 IBM 065: Data Transceiver Card Unit
 IBM 066: Data Transceiver Printing Card Unit
 IBM 067: Telegraph Signal Unit for 065/066
 IBM 068: Telephone Signal Unit for 065/066
 IBM 116: Numeric Duplicating Punch
 IBM 129: Card Data Recorder (integrated circuits—SLT, EBCDIC zone codes); 1971
 IBM 131: Alphabetic Duplicating Punch
 IBM 143: Tape Controlled Card Punch
 IBM 151: Verifier
 IBM 155: Numeric Verifier
 IBM 156: Alphabetic Verifier
 IBM 163: Card Controlled Tape Punch
 IBM 210: Electric Verifier
 IBM 797: Document Numbering Punch; 1951
 IBM 824: Typewriter Card Punch
 IBM 826: Typewriter Card Punch Printing
 IBM 884: Typewriter Tape Punch
 IBM 963: Tape Punch
IBM 5471: Printer-Keyboard for System/3
IBM 5475: Data Entry Keyboard for System/3
 IBM 5496: Data Recorder, Keypunch for IBM System/3's 96 column cards
 IBM 5924: IBM 029 attached with a special keyboard to allow input of Chinese, Japanese and Korean characters (RPQ)
 IBM Port-A-Punch: Port-A-Punch; 1958
 IBM Votomatic: Voting machine (Port-A-Punch balloting, 1965)

Sorters, statistical, and derived machines
 Hollerith automatic sorter: Horizontal sorter, 1901
 Hollerith 2: Card counting sorter
 IBM 70: Hollerith Vertical Sorter; 1908
 IBM 71: Vertical Sorter; 1928
 IBM 74: Printing Card Counting Sorter, 1930
 IBM 75: Card Counting Sorter
 IBM 76: Searching Sorter Punch
 IBM 80: Card Sorter, 1925
 IBM 81: Card Stencil Sorter
 IBM 82: Card Sorter, 1948
 IBM 83: Card Sorter, 1955
 IBM 84: Card Sorter, 1959
 IBM 86: Coupon Sorter
 IBM 101: Statistical Machine; 1952
 IBM 524: Duplicating Summary Punch (Numerical card punch, features of an 016 and can also be connected to a 101)
 IBM 106: Coupon Statistical Machine
 IBM 108: Card Proving Machine; 196X
 IBM 867: IBM 108 Output Typewriter
 IBM 109: Statistical Sorter
 IBM 5486: Card Sorter for IBM System/3's 96 column cards
 IBM 9900: Continuous Multiple Access Comparator

Collators
 IBM 072: Alphabetic Collator
 IBM 077: Electric Punched Card Collator; 1937
 IBM 078: Stencil Collator
 IBM 079: Stencil Printing Collator
 IBM 085: Numerical Collator; 1957
 IBM 087: Alphabetic Collator
 IBM 088: Numerical Collator
 IBM 089: Alphabetic Collator
 IBM 188: Alphabetic Collator

Reproducing punch, summary punch, gang punch, and derived machines
 IBM 501: Automatic Numbering Gang Punch
 IBM 511: Automatic Reproducing Punch
 IBM 512: Reproducing Punch, 1940
 IBM 513: Reproducing Punch, 1945
 IBM 514: Reproducing Punch
 IBM 515: Interpreting Reproducing Punch
 IBM 516: Automatic Summary Punch
 IBM 517: Gang Summary Punch, 1929
 IBM 518: Gang Summary Punch, 1929
 IBM 519: End Printing Reproducing Punch, 1946
 IBM 520: Computing Punch
 IBM 522: Duplicator Summary Punch
 IBM 523: Gang Summary Punch; 1949
 IBM 524: Duplicating Summary Punch (Numerical card punch, features of an 016 and can also be connected to a 101)
 IBM 526: Printing Summary Punch (electronic, BCD zone codes, "an 026 arranged for summary punching")
 IBM 528: Accumulating Reproducer
 IBM 534: Card Punch (connects to 870, 108, 1230, 1232)
 IBM 545: Output Punch (an 029 plus connector)
 IBM 549: Ticket Converter

Interpreters
 IBM 548: Interpreter
 IBM 550: Numerical Interpreter, 1935
 IBM 551: Automatic Check Writing Interpreter, 1935
 IBM 552: Alphabetic Interpreter
 IBM 554: Interpreter
 IBM 555: Alphabetic Interpreter
 IBM 556: Interpreter
 IBM 557: Alphabetic Interpreter
 IBM 938: Electrostatic Card Printer

Tabulators, accounting machines, printers
 Hollerith Census Tabulator: 1890
 Hollerith Integrating Tabulator: 1896
 Hollerith Automatic Feed Tabulator: 1900
 IBM 090: Hollerith Type I Tabulator, 1906
 IBM 091: Hollerith Type III Tabulator, 1921
 IBM 092: Electric Tabulating Machine(first Plugboard, later known as a Control Panel)
 IBM 093: Automatic Control Tabulator, 1914 (2 sets of reading brushes, STOP cards not needed)
 Hollerith Type 3-S Tabulator: 192x
 IBM 094: Non-print Automatic Checking Machine
 IBM 211: Accounting Machine
 IBM 212: Accounting Machine
 IBM 285: Electric Accounting Machine; 1927
 IBM 297: Numerical Accounting Machine
 IBM 298: Numerical Accounting Machine
 IBM 301: Hollerith Type IV Tabulator, 1928
 IBM 375: Invoicing Tabulator
 IBM Direct Subtraction Accounting Machine:
 IBM ATB: Alphabetic Tabulating model B; 1931
 IBM ATC: Alphabetic Tabulating model C; 1931? (soon after the ATB)
 IBM 401: Tabulator; 1933
 IBM Electromatic Table Printing Machine: Typesetting-quality printer; 1946
402 and known versions
 IBM 402: Alphabetic Accounting Machine 1948
 IBM 402: Computing Accounting Machine (with solid-state computing device)
 IBM 403: Alphabetic Accounting Machine, 1948(MLP—multiple line printing)(version of 402)
 IBM 403: Computing Accounting Machine (with solid-state computing device)(version of 402)
 IBM 412: Accounting Machine (version of 402)
 IBM 417: Numerical Accounting Machine (version of 402)
 IBM 419: Numerical Accounting Machine(version of 402)
 IBM 513, 514, 517, 519, 523, 526, 528, or 549: Summary punch for 402
 IBM 916: Bill Feed for 402(single sheet feed)
 IBM 923: Tape-Controlled Carriage for 402
 IBM 924: Dual Feed Tape Carriage for 402
 IBM 1997: Tape-Controlled Bill Feed 402

404
 IBM 404: Accounting Machine

405 and known versions
 IBM 405: Alphabetic Bookkeeping and Accounting Machine; 1934 (later: 405 Electric Punched Card Accounting Machine)
 IBM 416: Numerical Accounting Machine(version of 405)
 IBM 514, 519, 523, 526, 528, 549: Summary punch for 405
 IBM 921: International Automatic Carriage for 405, 416 (1938)

407 and known versions
 IBM 407: Alphabetic Accounting Machine; 1949
 IBM 407: Computing Accounting Machine (with solid-state computing device)
 IBM 408: Alphabetic Accounting Machine, 1957(version of 407)
 IBM 409: Accounting Machine; 1959(version of 407)
 IBM 421: WTC Computing Accounting Machine (with solid-state computing device)(version of 407)
 IBM 444: Accounting Machine(version of 407)
 IBM 447: WTC Computing Accounting Machine (with solid-state computing device)(version of 407)
IBM 514, 519, 523, 528, 549: Summary punch for 407
 IBM 922: Tape-Controlled Carriage for 407
 IBM 418: Numerical Accounting Machine
 IBM 420: Alphabetical Accounting Machine
 IBM 424: WTC Computing Accounting Machine (with solid-state computing device)
 IBM 426: Accounting Machine
 IBM 427: WTC Accounting Machine (for instance, suitable for British £sd currency)
 IBM 450: Accounting Machine
 IBM 632: Accounting Machine 
 IBM 850: Stencil Cutter
 IBM 856: Card-A-Type
 IBM 857: Document Writer
 IBM 858: Cardatype Accounting Machine, 1955
 IBM 534: IBM 858 Card Punch (similar to 024)
 IBM 536: IBM 858 Printing Card Punch (similar to 026)
 IBM 858: IBM 858 Control Unit
 IBM 863: IBM 858 Arithmetic Unit
 IBM 866: IBM 858 Non-Transmitting Typewriter
 IBM 868: IBM 858 Transmitting Typewriter
 IBM 961: IBM 858 8-channel Tape Punch
 IBM 962: IBM 858 5-channel Tape Punch
 IBM 972-1: IBM 858 Auxiliary Keyboard for Manual Entry—Twelve columns of keys* 
 IBM 861: Stencil Charger
 IBM 869: Typewriter
 IBM 870: Document Writing System
 IBM 834: IBM 870 Control Unit
 IBM 836: IBM 870 Control Unit
 IBM 865: IBM 870 Output typewriters
 IBM 866: IBM 870 Non-transmitting Typewriter
 IBM 868: IBM 870 Transmitting Typewriter
 IBM 536: IBM 870 Printing Card Punch
 IBM 961: IBM 870 Tape Punch (8 channel)
 IBM 962: IBM 870 Tape Punch (5 track)
 IBM 972-2: IBM 870 Auxiliary Keyboard
 IBM 919: Comparing Bill Feed
 IBM 920: Bill Feed
 IBM 921: International Automatic Carriage
 IBM 933: Carbon Ribbon Feed
 IBM 939: Electrostatic Address Label Printer
 IBM 953: Multiline Posting Machine
 IBM 954: Facsimile Posting Machine (fused carbon copy fanfold printout onto an account ledger card)
 IBM 964: Auxiliary Printing Tape Punch
 IBM 966: Code Comparing Unit
 IBM 973: Keyboard
 IBM 6400: Accounting Machine system; 1962
 IBM 6405: Account Machine
IBM 6410: Account Machine
IBM 6420: Account Machine
IBM 6430: Account Machine
IBM 6422: Auto Ledger Feed
 IBM 6425: Magnetic Ledger Unit 
 IBM 6426: Card Punch
 IBM 6428: Card Reader 
 IBM 6454: Paper Tape Reader
 IBM 6455: Paper Tape Punch

Calculators

 IBM Machine Load Computer: A side rule to determine machine work loads, 20–8704; 1953
 IBM 600: Automatic Multiplying Punch; 1931
 IBM 601: Electric Multiplier aka Automatic Cross-Footing Multiplying Punch; 1933
 IBM Relay Calculator: aka The IBM Pluggable Sequence Relay Calculator (Aberdeen Machine)
 IBM 602: Calculating Punch; 1946
 IBM 602A: Calculating Punch; 1948
 IBM 603: Electronic Multiplier; 1946
 IBM 604: Electronic Calculating Punch; 1948
 IBM 604: IBM 604 Calculating Unit
 IBM 521: IBM 604 Card Read Punch
 IBM 541: IBM 604 Card Read Punch
 IBM 605: Electronic Calculator; 1949 (version of 604)
IBM 527: IBM 605 High-Speed Punch
 IBM CPC: Card Programmed Electronic Calculator; 1949
 IBM 604: IBM 604 Calculating Unit
 IBM 521: IBM 604 Card Read Punch
 IBM 402: Accounting Machine
 IBM 417: Accounting Machine
 IBM 941: IBM CPC Auxiliary Storage Unit; (16—10-digit words)
 IBM CPC-II: Card Programmed Electronic Calculator; 1949
 IBM 605: Electronic Calculating Punch
 IBM 527: Card Read Punch
 IBM 412: Accounting Machine
 IBM 418: Accounting Machine
 IBM 941: IBM CPC Auxiliary Storage Unit; (16—10-digit words)
 IBM 607: Electronic Calculator; 1953
 IBM 529: IBM 607 Card Read Punch
 IBM 542: IBM 607 Card Read Punch
 IBM 942: IBM 607 Electronic Storage Unit; 1953
 IBM 608: Transistorized Electronic Calculator; 1957
 IBM 535: IBM 608 Card Read Punch
 IBM 609: Calculator; (transistorized) 1960
 IBM 623: Calculating Punch
 IBM 625: Calculating Punch
 IBM 626: Calculating Punch
 IBM 628: Magnetic Core Calculator
 IBM 565: IBM 628 Punching Unit
 IBM 632, IBM 633: Electronic Typing Calculator; 1958
 IBM 614: IBM 632/3 Typewriter output
 IBM 630: IBM 632 Arithmetic Unit
 IBM 631: IBM 632 Buffer memory
 IBM 634: IBM 632 Non-printing Card Punch
 IBM 635: IBM 632 Non-Printing Card Punch
 IBM 636: IBM 632/3 Printing Card Punch
 IBM 637: IBM 632 Printing Card Punch
 IBM 638: IBM 632 Companion Keyboard
 IBM 641: IBM 632 Card Reader
 IBM 645: IBM 632 Card Reader
 IBM 648: IBM 632 Tape Punch
 IBM 649: IBM 632 Paper Tape Reader
 IBM 644: Calculating Punch

Time equipment division

IBM manufactured a range of clocks and other devices until 1958 when they sold the Time Equipment Division to Simplex Time Recorder Company (SimplexGrinnell, as of 2001). See:

 International Time Recording Co. catalog (1935 or earlier)
 IBM 1956: History of the Time Equipment Division and its Products
 IBM: CONSOLIDATED LISTING OF IBM TIME & WEIGHING EQUIPMENT
 IBM 1958: Press release announcing the sale of the domestic time equipment (clocks et al.) business to Simplex Time Recorder Company.

Typewriters
 IBM Remote control keyboard
 IBM Electric typewriter:
 Model 01, 1935; 
 Model 01 (Formsholder), Model 02 (Formswriter), Model 10 (Front Feed) and Model 01 (Carbon Ribbon Model), 1937;
 Chinese Typewriter and Model 04 Arabic Electric Typewriter, 1946;
 Model 07 Card Stencil Typewriter, 1947;
 Models 01 and 06 with Automatic Line Selector, 1948;
 IBM Electromatic typewriter:
 Model 03 (Hektowriter), 1938;
 Model 06 (Toll Biller), 1940;
 Model 08 (Auto. Formswriter) and Model 09 (Manifest), 1941;
 IBM Electric Executive Typewriter, 1944;
 IBM Electric typewriter, both Standard and Executive:
 Model A, 1948, 1949; 
 Model B, 1954; 
 Model C, 1959;
 Model D, 1967;
 Flexowriter: sold to Friden, Inc. in the late 1950s

Typeball-based 
 IBM Selectric typewriter:
 IBM 6121: IBM 700 Series Selectric I, 1961;
 IBM 6126: IBM 800 Series Selectric II (1971) and Correcting Selectric II (1973);
 IBM 6701, 6702, 6703, 6704, 6705:  IBM Selectric III and Correcting Selectric III.
Selectric-based typewriters:
IBM Selectric Composer, 1966;
IBM 6375: IBM Electronic Selectric Composer, 1975;
IBM 6240: Magnetic card typewriter; 1977
IBM Electronic Typewriter 50 and Electronic Typewriter 60, 1978;
IBM Personal Typewriter, 1982;

Daisy wheel-based 
IBM Wheelwriter;
Wheelwriter 3 and Wheelwriter 5, 1984;
Wheelwriter System/20 and System/40, 1985;
Wheelwriter 6, 1986;
Wheelwriter Series II and Personal Wheelwriter, 1988;
IBM Quietwriter;

IBM dictation machines 
IBM dictation machines are always referenced by family and model name and never by machine type.  In fact the models are sometimes mistakenly taken to be machine types.  There are three brand names and several well known models:

IBM Executary dictation equipment line (1960-1972).

 IBM Executary Model 211 Dictation Machine (6165-211)
 IBM Executary Model 212 Transcribing Machine (6166-212)
 IBM Executary Model 224 Dictation Unit (6161-224)
 IBM Executary Model 271 Recorder (6171-271)

IBM input processing equipment (1972-1975)

IBM 6:5 Cartridge System (1975-1981)

 6:5 Recorder (6164-281)
 6:5 Transcriber (6164-282)
 6:5 Portable (6164-284)

Copier/Duplicators
IBM Copiers:
 IBM Copier (Machine type 6800-001); introduced 1970, withdrawn June 30, 1981
IBM Copier II (Machine type 6801-001); introduced 1972
 IBM 3896 tape/document converter (a modified IBM Copier II); withdrawn 1980
IBM Series III Copier Model 10 (Machine type 6802-001); introduced 1976
IBM Series III Copier Model 20 (Machine type 6803-001); introduced 1976
IBM Series III Copier Model 30 (Machine type 6805-001)
IBM Series III Copier Model 40 (Machine type 6806-001)
IBM Series III Copier Model 50 (Machine type 6809-001)
IBM Series III Copier/Duplicator Model 60 (Machine type 6808-001)
IBM Series III Copier/Duplicator Model 70 (Machine type 8880-001)
IBM Series III Copier/Duplicator Model 85 (Machine type 8885-001)
IBM Executive 102 Copier (Machine type 6820-001);introduced 1981, withdrawn 1982
Collators (a collator was a feature of a copier, but was sold as a separate machine type):

 IBM 6852-001 Collator
 IBM 6852-002 Collator
 IBM 6852-003 Collator
 IBM 6852-004 Collator
 IBM 8881-001 Collator
 IBM 8881-002 Collator

IBM also sold a range of copier supplies including paper rolls (marketed as IBM General Copy Bond), cut sheet paper (marketed as IBM multi-system paper) and toner.

The IBM line of Copier/Duplicators, and their associated service contracts, were sold to Eastman Kodak in 1988.

World War II ordnance and related products 
 M1 Carbine: Rifle
 M7 grenade launchers for M1 Garand rifles
 Browning Automatic Rifle: light machine gun
 20-millimeter aircraft cannon
 Aircraft and naval fire-control instruments
 90-millimeter anti-aircraft gun directors and prediction units
 Supercharger impellers
 Norden bombsight

Other non-computer products

 IBM 805: IBM Test Scoring Machine, 1938
 IBM 820 Time Punch
 IBM 9902: Test Scoring Punch 
 IBM Lectern: 1954
 IBM Radiotype —
 IBM Scanistor: Experimental solid-state optical scanning device
 IBM Shoebox: Voice recognition, 1962
 IBM Ticketograph: 1937
 IBM Toll Collection System —
 IBM Wireless Translation System: 1947
 IBM Hydrogen Peroxide Analyzer: 1982
 IBM PW 200 Percussive Welder: 1960s
 IBM Industrial Scale: 1930s
 IBM Style 5011: ¼ horsepower electric coffee mill; 1920s
 IBM Style 5117: ½ horsepower meat chopper; late 1920s
 IBM Electric Scoreboard: 1949
 IBM Cheese Slicer: 1911

Computers based on vacuum tubes (1950s)

For these computers most components were unique to a specific computer and are shown here immediately following the computer entry.

 IBM 305: RAMAC: Random Access Method of Accounting and Control; 1956
 IBM 305: Processing Unit
 IBM 323: IBM 305 Card Punch
 IBM 340: IBM 305 Power Supply
 IBM 350: IBM 305 Disk Storage
 IBM 370: IBM 305 Printer (not to be confused with the much later System/370 computers)
 IBM 380: IBM 305 Console
 IBM 381: IBM 305 Remote Printing Station
 IBM 382: IBM 305 Paper Tape Reader
 IBM 407: IBM 305 Accounting Machine (models R1, R2 used on-line)
 IBM 610: Automatic Decimal Point Computer; 1957
 IBM 650: Magnetic Drum Data Processing Machine; 1954
 IBM 355: IBM 650 RAMAC (Disk drive)
 IBM 407: IBM 650 Accounting machine on-line
 IBM 533: IBM 650 Card Read Punch
 IBM 537: IBM 650 Card Read Punch
 IBM 543: IBM 650 Card Reader
 IBM 544: IBM 650 Card Punch
 IBM 650: IBM 650 Console Unit
 IBM 652: IBM 650 Disk and Magnetic Tape Control Unit
 IBM 653: IBM 650 Auxiliary Unit (60—10-digit words of auxiliary storage, index registers, and decimal floating point)
 IBM 654: IBM 650 Auxiliary Alphabetic Unit
 IBM 655: IBM 650 Power Unit
 IBM 727: Magnetic Tape Reader/Recorder (7 Track—6 data bits & 1 parity bit; 200 Characters/inch)
 IBM 838: Inquiry Station
 IBM 701: Electronic Data Processing Machine; 1952. Known as the Defense Calculator while in development.
IBM 706: IBM 701 Electrostatic Storage Unit (2048—36-bit words)
 IBM 711: IBM 701 Card reader (150 cards/min); 1952
 IBM 716: IBM 701 Printer (150 lines/min); 1952
 IBM 721: IBM 701 Punched card recorder; 1952 (100 cards/min)
 IBM 726: IBM 701 Dual Magnetic Tape Reader/Recorder (7 Track—6 data bits & 1 parity bit; 100 Characters/inch)
 IBM 727: Magnetic Tape Reader/Recorder (7 Track—6 data bits & 1 parity bit; 200 Characters/inch)
 IBM 731: IBM 701 Magnetic Drum Reader/Recorder; 1952
 IBM 736: IBM 701 Power Frame #1
 IBM 737: IBM 701/IBM 704/IBM 709 Magnetic Core Storage Unit (4096—36-bit words)
 IBM 740: IBM 701/IBM 704/IBM 709 Cathode Ray Tube Output Recorder
 IBM 741: IBM 701 Power Frame #2
 IBM 746: IBM 701 Power Distribution Unit
 IBM 753: IBM 701 Magnetic Tape Control Unit
 IBM 780: Cathode Ray Tube Display (used with IBM 740)
 IBM 702: Electronic Data Processing Machine; 1953
 IBM 712: IBM 702 Card Reader
 IBM 717: IBM 702 Printer
 IBM 922: Tape-Controlled Carriage
 IBM 722: IBM 702 Card Punch
 IBM 727: Magnetic Tape Reader/Recorder (7 Track—6 data bits & 1 parity bit; 200 Characters/inch)
 IBM 732: IBM 702 Magnetic Drum Storage Unit
 IBM 752: IBM 702 Tape Control Unit
 IBM 756: IBM 702 Card Reader Control Unit
 IBM 757: IBM 702 Printer Control Unit
 IBM 758: IBM 702 Card Punch Control Unit
 IBM 704: Data Processing System; 1956
 IBM 711: Card Reader
 IBM 716: Line Printer
 IBM 721: Card Punch
 IBM 727: Magnetic Tape Reader/Recorder (7 Track—6 data bits & 1 parity bit; 200 Characters/inch)
 IBM 733: Magnetic Drum
 IBM 737: IBM 701/IBM 704/IBM 709 Magnetic Core Storage Unit (4096—36-bit words, 6-bit BCD characters)
 IBM 738: IBM 704/IBM 709 Magnetic Core Storage Unit (32768—36-bit words, 6-bit BCD characters)
 IBM 740: IBM 701/IBM 704/IBM 709 Cathode Ray Tube Output Recorder
 IBM 780: Cathode Ray Tube Display (used with IBM 740)
 IBM Card-to-Tape Converter (described in IBM 704 Reference manual)
 IBM 714: Card Reader
 IBM 727: Magnetic Tape Reader/Recorder (7 Track—6 data bits & 1 parity bit; 200 Characters/inch)
 IBM 759: Card Reader Control Unit
 IBM Tape-to-Card Converter (described in IBM 704 Reference manual)
 IBM 722: Card Punch
 IBM 727: Magnetic Tape Reader/Recorder (7 Track—6 data bits & 1 parity bit; 200 Characters/inch)
 IBM 758: Control Unit
 IBM Tape-controlled Printer (described in IBM 704 Reference manual)
 IBM 717: Printer
 IBM 922: Tape-Controlled Carriage
 IBM 727: Magnetic Tape Reader/Recorder (7 Track—6 data bits & 1 parity bit; 200 Characters/inch)
 IBM 757: Control Unit
 IBM Tape-controlled Printer (described in IBM 704 Reference manual)
 IBM 720: Printer
 IBM 727: Magnetic Tape Reader/Recorder (7 Track—6 data bits & 1 parity bit; 200 Characters/inch)
 IBM 719: Printer (dot matrix, 60 print positions)
 IBM 730: Printer (dot matrix, 120 print positions)
 IBM 760: Printer Control Unit
 IBM 705: Data Processing System; 1954
 IBM 714: Card Reader
 IBM 717: Printer
 IBM 922: Tape-Controlled Carriage
 IBM 720: Printer
 IBM 722: Card Punch
 IBM 727: Magnetic Tape Reader/Recorder (7 Track—6 data bits & 1 parity bit; 200 Characters/inch)
 IBM 729: Magnetic tape drive models 1 and 3 (7 Track—6 data bits & 1 parity bit; 200/556/800 Characters/inch)
 IBM 730: Printer (dot matrix, 120 print positions)
 IBM 734: Magnetic Drum Storage
 IBM 754: Tape Control
 IBM 757: Printer Control
 IBM 758: Card Punch Control
 IBM 759: Card Reader Control
 IBM 760: Control and Storage; connects 2 727 tape units and a 720A or 730A printer to CPU.
 IBM 767: Data Synchronizer
 IBM 774: Tape Data Selector
 IBM 777: Tape Record Coordinator 
 IBM 782: Console
 IBM 709: Data Processing System; 1958
 IBM 711: Card Reader
 IBM 716: Printer
 IBM 721: Card Punch
 IBM 729: Magnetic tape drive (7 Track—6 data bits & 1 parity bit; 200/556/800 Characters/inch)
 IBM 733: Magnetic Drum
 IBM 737: IBM 701/IBM 704/IBM 709 Magnetic Core Storage Unit (4096—36-bit words, 6-bit BCD characters)
 IBM 738: IBM 704/IBM 709 Magnetic Core Storage Unit (32768—36-bit words, 6-bit BCD characters)
 IBM 740: IBM 701/IBM 704/IBM 709 Cathode Ray Tube Output Recorder
 IBM 755: Tape Control Unit
 IBM 766: Data Synchronizer
 IBM 780: Cathode Ray Tube Display (used with IBM 740)
 Other (system not known)
 IBM 735: Print Control
 IBM 739: Additional Core Storage
 IBM 742: Power Unit
 IBM 743: Power Supply
 IBM 744: Power Unit
 IBM 745: Power Unit
 IBM 747: Tape Data Selector PS
 IBM 748: Data Synchronizer
 IBM 771: Card/Tape Converter
 IBM 775: Record Storage Unit
 IBM 776: Sp EDPM
 IBM 781: Console
 IBM 786: Stretch

Solid-state computers based on discrete transistors (1960s)

Further information: IBM mainframe, IBM minicomputer.

IBM 1400 series: 1240, 1401, 1410, 1420, 1440, 1450, 1460, 7010 

 IBM 1240: Banking system; 1963
 IBM 1241: Bank Processing Unit
 IBM 1401: Small business computer; 1959
 IBM 1402: IBM 1401 Card reader/punch
 IBM 1403: IBM 1401 Printer, type chain; 1959
 IBM 1416: IBM 1403 and IBM 3203 Interchangeable Train Cartridge 
 IBM 1405: IBM 1401/1410 RAMAC (Disk drive)
 IBM 1406: IBM 1401 Memory Expansion Unit (4000/8000/12000—6-bit characters, check bit, and wordmark)
 IBM 1407: IBM 1401 Console Inquiry Station
 IBM 1409: IBM 1401 Console Auxiliary
 IBM 7641: IBM 1401/1410/1460 Hypertape Control
 IBM 1410: Midrange business computer; 1960
 IBM 1411: IBM 1410 processing unit
 IBM 1414: IBM 1410/7010: I/O Synchronizer
 IBM 1014: IBM 1414 Remote Inquiry Unit

 IBM 1415: IBM 1410/7010—Console
 IBM 7631: IBM 1410/7010, IBM 7070/7074, 7080—File Control
 IBM 1420: High-speed bank transit system; 1962
 IBM 1440: Low-cost business computer; 1962
 IBM 1441: IBM 1440 Processing unit; 1962
 IBM 1442: IBM 1440, IBM 1130, and IBM System/360 Card reader/punch
 IBM 1443: IBM 1440/IBM 1620 II Printer, flying type bar
 IBM 1447: IBM 1240/1401/1440/1450/1460 Operator's Console
 IBM 1448: IBM 1240/1440/1460 Transmission Control Unit(between system and 1030/1050/1060/AT&T...)
 IBM 1450: Data Processing System for small banks; 1968
 IBM 1460: Almost twice as fast as the 1401; 1963
 IBM 1447: IBM 1460 System Console
 IBM 1461: IBM 1460—Input/Output Control
 IBM 1462: IBM 1460—Printer Control
 IBM 7010: High-capacity version of 1410; 1962

IBM 1620 

 IBM 1620: Data Processing System; 1959
 IBM 1443: IBM 1440/IBM 1620 II Printer, flying type bar
 IBM 1621: IBM 1620 Paper tape reader
 IBM 1622: IBM 1620 Punched card reader/punch
 IBM 1623: IBM 1620 I Memory Expansion Unit (20000/40000—4-bit digits, flag and check bits; CF8421)
 IBM 1624: IBM 1620 Paper tape punch
 IBM 1625: IBM 1620 II Memory Unit (20000/40000/60000—4-bit digits, flag and check bits; CF8421)
 IBM 1626: IBM 1620 Plotter control
 IBM 1627: IBM 1620 Plotter. Also used by IBM 1130.

IBM 7030 (Stretch) 
 IBM 7030: Supercomputer; 1960 (Stretch)
 IBM 353: IBM 7030 Disk drive
 IBM 354: IBM 7030 Disk drive controller
 IBM 7152: IBM 7030 Operator's Console
 IBM 7302: IBM 7030 Core Storage (16384 72-bit words: 64 data bits & 8 ECC bits)
 IBM 7303: IBM 7030 Disk Storage
 IBM 7503: IBM 7030 Punched card reader
 IBM 7612: IBM 7030 Disk Synchronizer
 IBM 7619: IBM 7030 I/O exchange (8, 16, 24, or 32 I/O channels)

IBM 7070 series: 7070, 7072, 7074 

 IBM 7070: Intermediate data processing system; 1960
 IBM 7072: Intermediate data processing system; 1962
 IBM 7074: Intermediate data processing system; 1961
IBM 729: IBM 7070/IBM 7074 Magnetic tape Unit
 IBM 1301: IBM 7070/IBM 7074 Disk Storage
 IBM 1302: IBM 7070/IBM 7074 Disk Storage
 IBM 7104: IBM 7074 High-Speed Processor
 IBM 7150: IBM 7070/IBM 7074 Console Control Unit
 IBM 7300: IBM 7070/IBM 7074 Disk Storage
 IBM 7301: IBM 7070/IBM 7074 Core Storage (5000/9990—10-digit words)
 IBM 7340: IBM 7070/IBM 7074 hypertape (7074 only)
 IBM 7400: IBM 7070/IBM 7074 Printer
 IBM 7500: IBM 7070/IBM 7074 Card Reader
 IBM 7501: IBM 7070/IBM 7074 Console Card Reader
 IBM 7550: IBM 7070/IBM 7074 Card Punch
 IBM 7600: IBM 7070/IBM 7074 Input-Output Control
 IBM 7601: IBM 7070 Arithmetic and Program Control
 IBM 7602: IBM 7070/IBM 7074 Core Storage Controller for IBM 7301
 IBM 7603: IBM 7070/IBM 7074 Input-Output Synchronizer
 IBM 7604: IBM 7070/IBM 7074 Tape Control
 IBM 7605: IBM 7070/IBM 7074 Disk Control
 IBM 7631: IBM 1410/IBM 7010, IBM 7070/IBM 7074, IBM 7080 File Control
 IBM 7640: IBM 7074/IBM 7080 Hypertape Control
 IBM 7802: IBM 7070/IBM 7074 Power Converter
 IBM 7907: IBM 7070/IBM 7074 Data Channel (8 bit)
 IBM 7710: Data Communication Unit
 IBM 7711: Data Communication Unit

IBM 7080 

 IBM 7080: High-capacity business computer; 1961
IBM 717: IBM 7080 150 LPM printer
IBM 720: IBM 7080 500 LPM printer
IBM 729: IBM 7080 Magnetic tape Unit
IBM 730: IBM 7080 1000 LPM printer
IBM 735: IBM 7080 Printer Control for IBM 730
IBM 757: IBM 7080 printer control for 717
IBM 760: IBM 7080 Control and Storage
Model 1 for IBM 720 Printer
Model 2 for IBM 730 Printer
 IBM 1301: IBM 7080 Disk Storage
 IBM 1302: IBM 7080 Disk Storage
 IBM 7153: IBM 7080 Console Control Unit
 IBM 7302: IBM 7080 Core Storage (80000/160000—6-bit characters, check bit ; CBA8421)
 IBM 7305: IBM 7080 Core Storage Controller and I/O Controller for IBM 7302
 IBM 7502: IBM 7080 Console Card Reader
 IBM 7621: IBM 7080 Tape Control (729)
 IBM 7622: IBM 7080 Signal Control (vacuum tube peripherals)
 IBM 7631: IBM 7080 File Control
 IBM 7640: IBM 7080 Hypertape Control
 IBM 7800: IBM 7080 Power Converter
 IBM 7801: IBM 7080 Power Control
 IBM 7908: IBM 7080 Data Channel (8 bit)

IBM 7090 series: 7040, 7044, 7090, 7094, 7094 II 

 IBM 7040: Low-cost version of 7094; 1963 Included an extension to the 7090/7094 instruction set to handle character string(s) thus improving the speed of commercial applications (COBOL).
 IBM 7106: Processing Unit
 IBM 1414: IBM 7040 I/O Synchronizer
 IBM 1014: IBM 1414 Remote Inquiry Unit
 IBM 1401: IBM 7040 card, printer, magnetic tape, tele-processing input/output
 IBM 7044: Low-cost version of 7094; 1963 This was a high performance version of the 7040 with the same extensions to the 7090/7094 instruction set; it also attached 7094 I/O devices.
 IBM 7107: Processing Unit
 IBM 1414: IBM 7040 I/O Synchronizer
 IBM 1401: IBM 7040 card, printer, magnetic tape, tele-processing input/output
 IBM 7090: High-capacity scientific computer; 1959
 IBM 7094: Improved version of 7090; 1962
 IBM 7094 II: Improved version of 7094; 1964
 IBM 711: IBM 7090/IBM 7094 Card Reader
 IBM 716: IBM 7090/IBM 7094 Printer
 IBM 721: IBM 7090/IBM 7094 Card Punch
 IBM 729: IBM 7090/IBM 7094 Magnetic tape Unit
 IBM 1301: IBM 7090/IBM 7094 Disk Storage
 IBM 1302: IBM 7090/IBM 7094 Disk Storage
 IBM 7151: IBM 7090 Console Control Unit
 IBM 7151-2: IBM 7094 Console Control Unit
 IBM 7302: IBM 7090/IBM 7094/IBM 7094 II Core Storage (32768—36-bit words, 6-bit BCD characters)
 IBM 7320: IBM 7090/IBM 7094 Drum Storage
 IBM 7340: IBM 7090/IBM 7094 Hypertape
 IBM 7606: IBM 7090/IBM 7094/IBM 7094 II Multiplexer and Core Storage Controller for IBM 7302
 IBM 7607: IBM 7090/IBM 7094 Data Channel (6 bit)
 IBM 7608: IBM 7090 Power Converter
 IBM 7617: IBM 7090/IBM 7094 Data Channel Console
 IBM 7618: IBM 7090 Power Control
 IBM 7631: IBM 7090/IBM 7094 File Control
 IBM 7640: IBM 7090/IBM 7094 Hypertape Control
 IBM 7909: IBM 7090/IBM 7094 Data Channel (8 bit)
 IBM 2361: NASA's Manned Spacecraft Center IBM 7094 II Core Storage Unit (524288—36-bit words); 1964

Later solid-state computers & systems

Computers based on SLT or discrete IC CPUs (1964–1989) 

 IBM 1130: high-precision scientific computer; 1965
 IBM 1132: IBM 1130 Printer, based on IBM 407 type-wheel mechanism
 IBM 1133: IBM 1130 Multiplexer and cycle stealer, to connect an IBM 1403 fast printer
 IBM 2020: System/360 Model 20 Central Processing Unit; almost a 360: 1966
 IBM 2022: System/360 Model 22 Central Processing Unit; small range 360
 IBM 2025: System/360 Model 25 Central Processing Unit; small range 360
 IBM 2030: System/360 Model 30 Central Processing Unit; small range 360
 IBM 2040: System/360 Model 40 Central Processing Unit; small range 360
 IBM 2044: System/360 Model 44 Central Processing Unit; scientific 360; business with special feature
 IBM 2050: System/360 Model 50 Central Processing Unit; mid range 360
 IBM 2060: System/360 Models 60 and 62 Central Processing Unit; mid-range 360; announced but never released
 IBM 2064: System/360 Models 64 and 66 Central Processing Unit; mid range 360; multi-processor with virtual memory (DAT); announced but never released
 IBM 2065: System/360 Model 65 Central Processing Unit; mid range 360: used by NASA in Apollo project
 IBM 2067: System/360 Model 67 Central Processing Unit; mid range 360; multi-processor with virtual memory (DAT)
 IBM 2070: System/360 Model 70 Central Processing Unit; high range 360; announced but never released
 IBM 2075: System/360 Model 75 Central Processing Unit; high range 360
 IBM 2085: System/360 Model 85 Central Processing Unit; high range 360
 IBM 5450: Display console used with Model 85 (80 characters x 35 lines)
 IBM 2091: System/360 Model 91 Central Processing Unit; high range 360
 IBM 2095: System/360 Model 95 Central Processing Unit; high range 360
 IBM 2195: System/360 Model 195 Central Processing Unit; high range 360
 IBM 3031: System/370-compatible mainframe; high range (first series to incorporate integral, i.e., internal, stand-alone channels, these being stripped-down 3158-type CPUs, but operating in "channel mode", only)
 IBM 3032: System/370-compatible mainframe; high range (first series to incorporate integral, i.e., internal, stand-alone channels, these being stripped-down 3158-type CPUs, but operating in "channel mode", only)
 IBM 3033: System/370-compatible multiprocessor complex; high range; 1977 (first series to incorporate integral, i.e., internal, stand-alone channels, these being stripped-down 3158-type CPUs, but operating in "channel mode", only)
 IBM 3036: Dual-display (operator's) console, shipped with 303X 
 IBM 3038: Multiprocessor Communication Unit for 3033 MP
 IBM 3042: Attached processor for 3033 Model A
 IBM 3081: System/370-compatible dual-processor mainframe; high range; models: D, G, G2, GX, K (1981), K2, KX (2 = enhanced version); 1980
 IBM 3082: Processor Controller
 IBM 3087: Coolant Distribution Unit
 IBM 3089: Power Unit
 IBM 3083: System/370-compatible mainframe, single processor 3081; high range; models: B (1982), B2, BX, CX, E (1982), E2, EX, J (1982), J2, JX
 IBM 3084: System/370-compatible Quad-processor mainframe; high range; 3081 + 3081 with same serial number, but two on/off switches; models: Q 2-way, Q 2-way2, QX 2-way, Q 4-way, Q 4-way2, QX 4-way; 1982
 IBM 3090: System/370 mainframe; high range; J series supersedes S series. Models: 150, 150E, 180, 200 (1985), 400 2-way (1985), 400 4-way (1985), 600E (1987), 600S (1988). A 400 actually consists of two 200s mounted together in a single frame. Although it provides an enormous computing power, some limits, like CSA size, are still fixed by the 16MB line in MVS.
 IBM 3115: System/370 Model 115 Central Processing Unit; small range
 IBM 3125: System/370 Model 125 Central Processing Unit; small range
 IBM 3135: System/370 Model 135 Central Processing Unit; small range
 IBM 3145: System/370 Model 145 Central Processing Unit; small range
 IBM 3155: System/370 Model 155 Central Processing Unit; mid range; without virtual memory [DAT] unless upgraded to 155-II
 IBM 3165: System/370 Model 165 Central Processing Unit; mid range; without virtual memory [DAT] unless upgraded to 165-II
 IBM 3066: Display console used with Models 165 and 166 (80 characters x 35 lines)
 IBM 3138: System/370 Model 138 Central Processing Unit; small range;
 IBM 3148: System/370 Model 148 Central Processing Unit; small range;
 IBM 3158: System/370 Model 158 Central Processing Unit; mid range;
 IBM 3168: System/370 Model 168 Central Processing Unit; mid range;
 IBM 3066: Display console used with Models 165 and 166 (80 characters x 35 lines)
 IBM 3195: System/370 Model 195 Central Processing Unit; high range; without virtual memory [DAT]
 IBM 3741: data station; 1973
 IBM 3790: distributed computer; announced 1975 (followed by the IBM 8100)
 IBM 3791: Controller, model 1 or 2.
 IBM 3792: Auxiliary control unit.
 IBM 3793: Keyboard-Printer.
 IBM 4300: series of System/370-compatible mainframe models; 1979
 IBM 4321: System/370-compatible mainframe; low range; successor of 4331
 IBM 4321: System/370-compatible mainframe; low range; 1979
 IBM 4331: System/370-compatible mainframe; low range; 1979
 IBM 4341: System/370-compatible mainframe; mid range; 1979
 IBM 4361: System/370-compatible mainframe; low range; 1983
 IBM 4381: System/370-compatible mainframe; mid range; 1983
 IBM 5100: portable computer; evolution of the 1973 SCAMP (Special Computer APL Machine Portable) prototype; 1975
 IBM 5110: portable computer; models 1, 2 & 3 featured a QIC tape drive, and then floppy disk drives; 1978
 IBM 5120: portable computer; featured two built-in 8-inch 1.2 MB floppy disk drives; 1980
 IBM 5280: Distributed Data System; 1980
 IBM 5281: Data Station for 5280
 IBM 5282: Dual Data Station for 5280
 IBM 5285: Programmable Data Station 
 IBM 5286: Dual Programmable Data Station 
 IBM 5288: Programmable Control Unit 
 IBM 5225: Printer for 5280 (floor-standing; Models 1, 2, 3, 4)
 IBM 5256: Printer for 5280 (table-top, dot-matrix; Models 1, 2, 3)
 IBM 5320: System/32, low-end business computer; 1975
 IBM 5340: System/34, System unit, successor of System/32, but had also a second System/3 processor; 1977
 IBM 5360: System/36 System Unit
 IBM 5362: System/36 System Unit
 IBM 5363: System/36 System Unit
 IBM 5364; System/36 System Unit
 IBM 5381: System/38 System Unit; 1978
 IBM 5382: System/38 System Unit
 IBM 5410: System/3 model 10 processor; for small businesses; 1969
 IBM 5415: System/3 model 15 processor; 1973
 IBM 5520: Administrative System; 1979
 IBM 8100: distributed computer; announced 1978
 IBM 8150: processor
 IBM 9370: series of System/370 mainframe models; partly replaced IBM 8100; low range; 1986
 IBM 9371: "Micro Channel 370" ESA models 010, 012, 014 (later 110, 112, 114); 1990
 IBM 9373: models 20, 30
 IBM 9375: models 40, 50, 60
 IBM 9377: models 80 and 90
 IBM Series/1: brand name for process control computers; 1976 
 IBM System/3: brand name for small business computers; 1969
 IBM System/36: brand name for minicomputers; successor of System/34; 1983
 IBM System/38: brand name for minicomputers; indirect successor of IBM Future Systems project; 1979
 IBM System/360: brand name for mainframes; 1964
 IBM System/370: brand name for mainframes, successor of System/360; 1970
 Application System/400: brand name for computers, successor of System/38; 1988

Computers based on discrete IC CPUs (1990–present) 

 IBM ES/9000 family of System/390 mainframes; 1990
 IBM ES/9021: water-cooled ES/9000 type
 IBM ES/9121: air-cooled standalone ES/9000 type
 IBM ES/9221: air-cooled rack mounted ES/9000 type
 IBM 9406: AS/400 minicomputer
 IBM AS/400: midrange computer system, successor to System/38; 1988
 System/390: brand name for mainframes with ESA/390 architecture; successor of System/370; 1990

Computers based on microprocessor CPUs (1981–present)

Computers
 IBM System/23: DataMaster, based on the Intel 8085
 IBM 2003: a very small mainframe with System/390 architecture; 1990s, also known as Multiprise 2000
 IBM 2064: zSeries z900; note number collision with earlier System/360-64; 2000
 IBM 2066: zSeries z800; less powerful variant of the z900
 IBM 2084: zSeries z990; successor of larger z900 models
 IBM 2086: zSeries z890; successor of the z800 and smaller z900 models; 2004
 IBM 2094: System z9 Enterprise Class (z9 EC); initially known as z9-109; 2005
 IBM 2096: System z9 Business Class (z9 BC); successor to z890; 2006
 IBM 2097: System z10 Enterprise Class (z10 EC); successor to z9 EC; 2008
 IBM 2098: System z10 Business Class (z10 BC); successor to z9 BC; 2008
 IBM 2817: zEnterprise 196 (z196); successor to z10 EC; 2010
 IBM 2818: zEnterprise 114 (z114); successor to z10 BC; 2011
 IBM 2827: zEnterprise EC12 (zEC12); successor to z196; 2012
 IBM 2828: zEnterprise BC12 (zBC12); successor to z114; 2013
 IBM 2964: IBM z Systems z13 (z13); successor to zEC12; 2015
 IBM Personal Computer: Superseded the IBM Portable Computer.
 IBM 5150: the classic IBM PC—1981
 IBM 5160: IBM Personal Computer XT—1983
 IBM 5162: IBM Personal Computer XT/286
 IBM 5271: IBM 3270 PC—1983
 IBM 5160 Model 588: PC XT/370, a PC XT with a special add-in card containing an Intel 8087 math coprocessor and two Motorola 68000 chips to execute/emulate the System/370 instructions—1983.
 IBM 5155: IBM Portable—1984
 IBM 4860: IBM PCjr—1984
 IBM 5170: IBM Personal Computer/AT—1984
 IBM 5140: IBM Convertible—1986
 IBM 5281: IBM 3270 PC but based on an IBM AT.
 IBM 5550: Personal Computer Series for Japan, South Korea, Taiwan and China
 IBM 5510: IBM JX (for Japan, Australia and New Zealand)
 IBM 5511: IBM JX (for Japan, Australia and New Zealand)
 IBM 5530: Smaller desktop, without communications adapter
 IBM 5535: Portable
 IBM 5541: Desktop
 IBM 5551: Floor standing
 IBM 5561: Larger floor standing
 IBM PS/2: range
 IBM PS/1: range, later succeeded by IBM Aptiva
 IBM Aptiva: Personal Computer
 IBM PS/ValuePoint: range
 IBM RT PC: series; ROMP-based; 1986
 IBM 4575: System/88 processor; 1986
 IBM 4576: System/88 processor
 IBM 7060, also known as Multiprise 3000: a very small mainframe with System/390 architecture; models H30, H50, H70; 1999
 IBM System 9000: lab data controller, based on Motorola 68000
 IBM 9075: PCradio, a battery-powered personal computer; 1991
 IBM 9672: largest mainframes from System/390 line; 1994
 G1: 9672-Rn1, 9672-Enn, 9672-Pnn
 G2: 9672-Rn2, 9672-Rn3
 G3: 9672-Rn4
 G4: 9672-Rn5
 G5: 9672-nn6
 G6: 9672-nn7
 IBM 9674: coupling facility for interconnecting IBM 9672 computers
 IBM PC Series: PC300 and 700 range including 300GL and 300PL
 IBM NetVista: Corporate PCs
 IBM ThinkCentre: PC range now made under license by Lenovo Group
 IBM ThinkPad: Notebooks now made under license by Lenovo Group
 IBM IntelliStation Workstations: Pro based on Intel PC processors, and POWER based on PowerPC processors
 System/390: brand name for mainframes with ESA/390 architecture; successor of System/370; 1990
 IBM AS/400: Later iSeries and System i, merged into IBM Power Systems in 2008; 1988
 IBM System p: First RS/6000, then pSeries, then p5 and now System p5, merged into IBM Power Systems in 2008; 1990
 IBM System x: Originally PC Server, then Netfinity, then xSeries and now System x
 System z: brand name for mainframes with z/Architecture; rename of zSeries; 2006
 zSeries: brand name for mainframes with z/Architecture; successor of System/390; 2000
 IBM PureSystems: Converged system
 IBM System Cluster 1350
 IBM BladeCenter: IBM's Blade server architecture
 IBM eServer 32x: AMD processor-based server products
 IBM OpenPower: POWER5 based hardware for running Linux.

Supercomputers
 IBM Blue Gene: 2000
 IBM Kittyhawk: 2008 White paper issued.

Microprocessors
 IBM 801: Pioneering prototype RISC processor; 1980
 IBM ROMP: RISC processor, also known as 032 processor
 IBM APC: RISC Processor, successor to the 032
 IBM CnC/M68000: Processor for XT/370 and AT/370
 IBM P/370: Processor for Personal System 370
 IBM P/390 microprocessor: processor for P/390 and R/390
 IBM Power: Processors for some RS/6000 and successors, later IBM AS/400, and IBM Power Systems
 POWER1
 POWER2
 POWER3
 POWER4
 POWER5
 POWER6
 POWER7
 POWER8
 POWER9
 Power10
 PowerPC: Processors for some RS/6000 and successors and earlier IBM AS/400, some also used in non-IBM systems
 PowerPC 601
 PowerPC 603
 PowerPC 604
 PowerPC 620
 PowerPC 7xx
 PowerPC 4xx embedded CPUs
 IBM RS64
 PowerPC 970
 Cell microprocessor
 Gekko, Broadway and Xenon CPUs for game consoles.
 IBM z/Architecture processors: for z/Architecture mainframes
 IBM z10
 IBM z196
 IBM zEC12
 IBM z13
 IBM z14
 IBM z15
 IBM Telum

Solid-state computer peripherals

Punched card and paper tape equipment
 IBM 1011: IBM 1401/1440/1460/1414 I/O Sync—Paper Tape Reader
 IBM 1012: IBM 1401/1440/1460—Tape Punch
 IBM 1017: IBM S/360—Paper Tape Reader
 IBM 1018: IBM S/360—Paper Tape Punch
 IBM 1134: paper tape reader
 IBM 1402: IBM 1401 and several other systems card reader/punch
 IBM 1412: Punched card reader/punch
 IBM 1442: IBM 1440 and IBM System/360 Card reader/punch
 IBM 1444: IBM 1240/1440 Punched card reader/punch
 IBM 1622: IBM 1620 Card reader/punch
 IBM 1902: Paper Tape Punch
 IBM 1903: Paper Tape Reader
 IBM 2501: IBM System/360 Card reader (up to 1,200 cpm)
IBM 2502: Card Reader
 IBM 2520 Card Read Punch (Model A1), Card Punch (Models A2, A3)
 IBM 2540: IBM System/360 Card reader/punch
 IBM 2560: IBM System/360 Model 20 Multifunction card machine (reader/punch/interpreter/multi-hopper)
 IBM 2671: Paper Tape Reader
 IBM 3504: Card reader
 IBM 3505: Card reader
 IBM 3525: Multi-function card unit
 IBM 5424: IBM System/3 MFCU Multi Function Card Unit (reader/punch/printer/multi-hopper)- 96 column cards
 IBM 5425: IBM System/370 MFCU Multi Function Card Unit (reader/punch/printer/multi-hopper), for handling 96-column cards

Microfilm products 
IBM announced a range of Microfilm products in 1963 and 1964 and withdrew them in 1969.

 IBM 9921: Document Viewer Model I
IBM 9922: Document Viewer Model II
IBM 9948: Thermal Copier
 IBM 9949: Micro Viewer
 IBM 9950: Diazo Copier
 IBM 9951: Camera
 IBM 9952: Standard Micro-Viewer-Printer
 IBM 9953: Viewer-Printer Stacker Module
 IBM 9954: Diazo Copier
 IBM 9955: Microfiche Processor
 IBM 9956: Camera
 IBM 9965: Diazo Copier

Printer/plotter equipment
 IBM 1094: Line-Entry Keyboard
 IBM 1403: High-Speed Impact Printer
 IBM 1404: IBM 1401/Sys360—Printer 
 IBM 1416: Impact Printer print character chain
 IBM 1445: IBM 1240/1401/1440/Sys360—Printer
 IBM 1446: IBM 1440—Printer Control unit for 1403
 IBM 2203: Printer
IBM 2213: Printer
 IBM 2245: Line printer for Chinese, Japanese and Korean text 
 IBM 2280: Film Recorder
 IBM 2282: Film Recorder/Scanner
 IBM 2285: Display Copier
 IBM 2350: Graphics display system; 1977
 IBM 2680: High-speed photo typesetter; 1967
 IBM 3130: Advanced Function Printer 
 IBM 3160: Advanced Function Printer
 IBM 3170: Full Color Digital Printer
 IBM 3203: Printer
 IBM 3211: High-Speed Impact Printer for Sys/370
 IBM 3216: 3211 Impact Printer's Character print train
 IBM 3262: Line printer
 IBM 3268: Dot matrix printer
 IBM 3284: Printer
 IBM 3287: Color printer; 1979
 IBM 3288: Line printer
 IBM 3800: First laser printer introduced by IBM; 1976–1990. incl. photo
 IBM 3800-1: Early laser printer, 1975
 IBM 3800-2: Part of IBM Kanji System for Japanese language processing, 1979
 IBM 3800-3: Continuous form printer; 1982
 IBM 3812: Table top page printer; 12 ppm, 1986
 IBM 3816: Table top page printer; 24 ppm, 1989
 IBM 3820: Laser page printer; 20 ppm, 1985
 IBM 3825: Laser page printer; 58 ppm, 1989
 IBM 3827: Laser page printer; 92 ppm, 1988
 IBM 3828: MICR Laser page printer; 92 ppm, 1990
 IBM 3829: Laser page printer; 92 ppm, 1993
IBM 3835: Continuous forms laser printer; 88ppm, 1988
 IBM 3852-2: Inkjet printer for IBM 3192 terminal
 IBM 3900: Various models 001; OW1 DR1/2 etc., succeeded by infoprint 4000
 IBM 3935: Laser page printer; 35 ppm, 1993
 IBM 4000: Various models succeeded by infoprint 4100
 IBM 4019: Laser printer for PC. 10 text pages per minute.
 IBM 4039-16L: Lexmark laser printer
 IBM 4055: InfoWindow touch screen display
 IBM 4079: Color inkjet printer
 IBM 4201: ProPrinterII Model 002
 IBM 4202: ProPrinter XL
 IBM 4207: ProPrinter X24
 IBM 4208: ProPrinter XL24
 IBM 4210: APA matrix table top WS printer for the S/38-36
 IBM 4214: Table top printer
 IBM 4216: Personal pageprinter model 020
 IBM 4224: Table top serial printer; 1986
 IBM 4230: Tabletop matrix printer, 600cps. Also 4232
 IBM 4234: Floor standing dot band printer; 1986
 IBM 4245: Line printer
 IBM 4247: Tabletop matrix printer, 1100cps
 IBM 4248: Impact printer; 1984
 IBM 4250/II: ElectroCompositor model 002
IBM 4279: Terminal Control Unit (for 4506 Digital TV Displays) 
IBM 4506: Digital TV display unit 
 IBM 4975: Printer
 IBM 5081: Color and monochrome display; separate RGB connections, capable of 1280×1024 resolution, up to  diagonal.
 IBM 5083: Tablet
 IBM 5087: Screen printer
 IBM 5201: Printer
 IBM 5202: Printer (Quietwriter III)
 IBM 5203: Line printer for System/3.  Ran at 100 or 200 lines per minute.
 IBM 5210: Printer
IBM 5211: Printer 160 or 300 lpm, sold with System/34
 IBM 5215: Selectric-element printer for Displaywriter
 IBM 5218: Daisywheel printer for Displaywriter
 IBM 5219: Letter quality printer
 IBM 5223: Wheelprinter E
 IBM 5224: Table top printer
 IBM 5225: Floor standing printer
 IBM 5253: CRT display station for 5520; 1979
 IBM 5254: CRT display station for 5520; 1979
 IBM 5256: Table top printer; 1977
 IBM 5257: Daisy wheel printer for 5520; 1979
 IBM 5258: Ink jet printer for 5520; 1979
 IBM 5262: Floor standing line printer
 IBM 5394: Twinax remote controller (also 5494)
 IBM 6153: Advanced monochrome graphics display
 IBM 6154: Advanced color graphics display
 IBM 6155: Extended monochrome graphics display
 IBM 6180: Color plotter
 IBM 6186: Color plotter
 IBM 6262: Line Printer
 IBM 6400: Line matrix printer
 IBM 6500: IPDS printer, coax or twinax attached
 IBM 6670: Information Distributor; combination laser printer and photocopier; part of Office System/6; 1979
 IBM 7701: Magnetic Tape Transmission Terminal; 1960
 IBM 7372: Color plotter, 6 pen, desktop
 IBM 7374: Color plotter
 IBM 7375: Color plotter
 IBM 7350: Image processor, a specialized terminal for scientific and research applications; 1983
 IBM 7400: IBM 7070/IBM 7074 Printer
 IBM 7404: Graphic Output
 IBM 7456: Plant floor terminal
 IBM 7900: IBM 7070/IBM 7074 Inquiry Station
 IBM 8775: Terminal
 IBM LPFK: Lighted Program Function Keyboard
 IBM XY749: Plotter
 IBM XY750: Plotter

Data storage units

Core storage
 IBM 2360: Processor Storage for the (never shipped) IBM System/360 models 60 and 64
 IBM 2361: Large Capacity Storage for the IBM System/360 models 50, 60, 62, 65, 70, and 75
 IBM 2362: Processor Storage for the (never shipped) IBM System/360 models 62, 66, 68 and 70
 IBM 2365: Processor Storage for the IBM System/360 models 65, 67, 75 and 85
 IBM 2385: Processor Storage for the IBM System/360 model 85
 IBM 2395: Processor Storage for the IBM System/360 models 91 and 95

Direct-access storage devices
In IBM's terminology beginning with the System/360 disk and such devices featuring short access times were collectively called DASD. The IBM 2321 Data Cell is a DASD that used tape as its storage medium. See also history of IBM magnetic disk drives.
 IBM 353: Disk drive for IBM 7030 Stretch
 IBM 1301: IBM 1240/1410/1440/1460/70XX—Disk drive; 1961
 IBM 1302: Disk drive
 IBM 1311: IBM 1240/1401/1410/1440/1450/1460/1620/7010/1710/7740 Disk drive using IBM 1316 disk pack
 IBM 1316: 2,000,000-character removable disk pack for 1311, 2311; 1962
 IBM 1405: Disk drive
 IBM 1742: IBM System Storage DS4500
 IBM 1814: IBM System Storage DS4700
 IBM 1750: IBM System Storage DS6000 Series
 IBM 1815: IBM System Storage DS4800
 IBM 2072: IBM Storwize V3700 (IBM FlashSystem 5000)
 IBM 2073: IBM Storwize V7000 Unified
 IBM 2076: IBM Storwize V7000 (IBM FlashSystem 7200)
 IBM 2078: IBM Storwize V5000
 IBM 2105: Enterprise Storage Server, or ESS, or Shark (utilized 7133)
 IBM 2106: Extender for IBM 2105 Shark
 IBM 2107: IBM System Storage DS8000 Series
 IBM 2301: Drum Storage Unit
 IBM 2302: Disk drive
 IBM 2303: Drum Storage Unit
 IBM 2305-1: Fixed head disk 3.0 MB/s Transfer rate, 5 MB capacity
 IBM 2305-2: Fixed head disk 1.5 MB/s Transfer rate, 10 MB capacity
 IBM 2310: Cartridge disk drive, used 2315 cartridge. 
 IBM 2315: 1 MB cartridge used on 2310 and with a disk drive component on multiple systems, e.g. IBM 1130. 
 IBM 2311: Disk drive using IBM 1316 disk pack (removable—7.5 MB)
 IBM 2312: Disk drive using IBM 2316 disk pack (removable—28.6 MB)
 IBM 2313: Disk facility with 4 disk drives using IBM 2316 disk pack (removable—28.6 MB)
 IBM 2314: Disk subsystem with 9 drives, one spare using IBM 2316 disk pack (removable—28.6 MB)
 IBM 2318: Disk facility with 2 disk drives using IBM 2316 disk pack (removable—28.6 MB)
 IBM 2319: Disk Facility with 3 disk drives using IBM 2316 disk pack (removable—28.6 MB)
IBM 2316: 28.6 MB Disk pack for 2314 et al.
 IBM 2321: Data cell drive. Drive with removable cells containing tape strips (400 MB)
 IBM 2421: IBM System Storage DS8000 Series with 1 year's warranty
 IBM 2422: IBM System Storage DS8000 Series with 2 years' warranty
 IBM 2423: IBM System Storage DS8000 Series with 3 years' warranty
 IBM 2424: IBM System Storage DS8000 Series with 4 years' warranty
 IBM 2810: IBM XIV Storage System (Generations 1 through 3; varies by model)
 IBM 2812: IBM XIV Storage System (Generations 1 through 3; varies by model)
 IBM 2851: IBM Scale-Out Network Attached Storage (SONAS)
 IBM 3310: Fixed FBA drive
 IBM 3330: Disk drive. (100 MB each spindle, up to 32 spindles per "subsystem"); 1970
 IBM 3336: Disk pack for 3330–1, 3330–2; 1970
 IBM 3330-11: Disk drive. Double the density of 3330–1; 1973.
 IBM 3336-11: Disk pack for 3330–11; 1973
 IBM 3333: Disk drive, a variant of 3330 and 3333-11
 IBM 3340: 'Winchester'-type disk drive, removable. Model -4, more?; 1973
IBM 3348: 35 or 70 MB data modules used with IBM 3340
 IBM 3344: Four 3340's simulated with a 3350 HDA under the covers
 IBM 3350: Disk drive (317.10 MB—1976)
 IBM 3363: Optical disk drive
 IBM 3370: FBA drive (used to store microcode and config info for the 3090. Connected through 3092); native DASD for 4331, 4361 (70 MB—1979).
 IBM 3375: Disk drive ("The Ugly Duckling" of IBM's DASD devices). 409.8 MB/actuator. First with dual-path access (via 'D' box)
 IBM 3380: Disk drive; 2.46 GB per each 2-drive module (1981), later double- and triple-density versions
 IBM 3390: Disk drive; 1, 2, 3 and 9 GB initially; later expanded to 27 GB
 IBM 3830: Storage control models 1, 2 and 3
 IBM 3850: Mass Storage System (MSS); virtual 3330-1 volumes, each backed up by a pair of cartridges, 1974
IBM 3830-11: Provided virtual 3330-1 (3330V) drives to the host; attached staging 3330 and 3350 drives for use by the 3851, 1974
IBM 3851: Mass Storage Facility. Robot arms retrieving cylindrical helically scanned tape cartridges.
 IBM 3880: Dual-channel DASD controller for 3350,3375,3380. 1981. Later models with up to 64MB cache. First hard disk cache in the industry.
 IBM 3990: Quad-channel DASD controller for 3390.
IBM 4662: IBM FlashSystem 5200
 IBM 4963: Disk subsystem
 IBM 4967: High performance disk subsystem
 IBM 5444: Fixed/Removable disk file for System/3
IBM 5445: Disk Storage for System/3
IBM 5447: Disk Storage and Control for System/3
 IBM 7133: SSA Disk Enclosure (for RS/6000)
 IBM 7300: IBM 7070/IBM 7074 Disk Storage
 IBM 7320: Drum drive
 IBM 9331: 8" Floppy disk drive
 IBM 9332: Disk drive; 1986
 IBM 9333: Serial Link Disk Subsystem
 IBM 9335: Disk subsystem in a set of drawers. For AS/400, System 36/38 or 9370
 IBM 9337: Disk Array Subsystem; 1992
 IBM 9345: Disk Array Subsystem; employed commodity 5¼" hard drives; simulated 3390 hard disks but had a smaller track capacity

Magnetic tape storage
 IBM 050: Magnetic Data Inscriber (key operated, records on tape cartridge for IBM 2495 data entry into an IBM System 360)
 IBM 729: Magnetic tape drive (7 Track—6 data bits & 1 parity bit; 200/556/800 Characters/inch)
 IBM 2401: Magnetic tape drive (7 Track—6 data bits & 1 parity bit; 200/556/800 Characters/inch)
 IBM 2401: Magnetic tape drive (9 Track—8 data bits & 1 parity bit; 800/1600 Characters/inch)
 IBM 2415: Magnetic tape drive (9 Track—8 data bits & 1 parity bit; 800/1600 Characters/inch)
 IBM 2420: Magnetic tape drive (9 Track—8 data bits & 1 parity bit)
 IBM 2440: Magnetic tape drive (9 Track—8 data bits & 1 parity bit)
 IBM 2495: Tape Cartridge Reader (reads IBM 050 prepared cartridges into an IBM System 360)
 IBM 3400-4: Lower density tape
 IBM 3400-6: Normal tape
 IBM 3410: Magnetic tape drive (9 Track—8 data bits & 1 parity bit); 1971
 IBM 3411: Magnetic tape unit and controller
IBM 3420: Magnetic tape drive (9 Track—8 data bits & 1 parity bit)
 IBM 3422: Magnetic tape drive (9 Track—8 data bits & 1 parity bit); 1986
 IBM 3424: Tape unit. Brazil and SA only.
 IBM 3430: Top loading tape drive; 1983
 IBM 3440: Magnetic tape drive (9 Track—8 data bits & 1 parity bit)
 IBM 3480: Cartridge tape drive; 1984
 IBM 3490: Cartridge tape drive; 1991
 IBM 3494: Enterprise tape library
 IBM Virtual Tape Server (VTS): tape virtualization engine for IBM 3494
 IBM 3495: Robotic tape library
 IBM 3573 models L2U, L3S, F3S: TS3100 Tape Library
 IBM 3573 models L4U, L2H, F3H: TS3200 Tape Library
 IBM 3576: TS3310 Tape Library
 IBM 3577: TS3400 Tape Library
 IBM 3580: LTO tape drive
 IBM 3584: TS3500 Tape Library
 IBM 3584: TS4500 Tape Library
 IBM 3588 model F3B: TS1030 Tape Drive; LTO3
 IBM 3588 model F4A: TS1040 Tape Drive; 2007; LTO4; TS2340 is a standalone version
 IBM 3590: tape drive (Magstar)
 IBM 3592: TS1120 Tape Drive; model J1A known as Jaguar in 2004; model E05 in 2007
 IBM 3803: Magnetic tape drive (9 Track—8 data bits & 1 parity bit)
 IBM 3954: TS7510 and TS7520 Virtualization Engines
 IBM 3954: TS7510 and TS7520 Virtualization Engines
 IBM 3956: TS7740 Virtualization Engine; models CC6 and CX6
 IBM 3957: TS7700 Virtualization Engine; model V06
 IBM 4480: Cartridge drives which could be mounted by a robot
 IBM 4580: System/88 disk drive
 IBM 4581: System/88 disk drive
 IBM 4585: Autoload streaming magnetic tape unit
 IBM 4968: Autoload streaming magnetic tape unit
 IBM 6157: Streaming tape drive
 IBM 7208: 8mm SCSI tape drive
 IBM 7330: Magnetic tape drive (7 Track—6 data bits & 1 parity bit; 200/556 Characters/inch)
 IBM 7340: Hypertape
 IBM 8809: Magnetic tape unit
 IBM 9347: Magnetic tape drive (9 Track—8 data bits & 1 parity bit)
 IBM 9349: Magnetic tape drive (9 Track—8 data bits & 1 parity bit)

Optical storage
 IBM 1350: Photo Image Retrieval System
 IBM 1360: Photodigital Storage System (terabit)
IBM 1352: Cell File
IBM 1361: Cell File and Control
IBM 1364: Photo-Digital Reader
IBM 1365: Photo-Digital Recorder
IBM 1367: Data Controller
 IBM 3995: Optical Library (terabyte)

Storage networking and virtualization
 IBM 3044: Fiber optic channel extender link
 IBM 9034: ESCON/Parallel Converter
 IBM 2005: Storage area network (SAN) Fibre Channel switch (OEM from Brocade Communications Systems)
 IBM 2029: Dense Wavelength Division Multiplexer (OEM from Nortel)
 IBM 2031: Storage area network (SAN) Fibre Channel switch (OEM from McData)
 IBM 2032: Storage area network (SAN) Fibre Channel switch (OEM from McData)
 IBM 2053: Storage area network (SAN) Fibre Channel switch (OEM from Cisco)
 IBM 2054: Storage area network (SAN) Fibre Channel switch (OEM from Cisco)
 IBM 2061: Storage area network (SAN) Fibre Channel switch (OEM from Cisco)
 IBM 2062: Storage area network (SAN) Fibre Channel switch (OEM from Cisco)
 IBM 2103-H07: SAN Fibre Channel Hub
 IBM 2109: Storage area network (SAN) Fibre Channel switch (OEM from Brocade Communications Systems)
 IBM 2498: Storage area network (SAN) Fibre Channel switch (OEM from Brocade Communications Systems)
 IBM 2499: Storage area network (SAN) Fibre Channel switch (OEM from Brocade Communications Systems)
 IBM 3534: Storage area network (SAN) Fibre Channel switch (OEM from Brocade Communications Systems)
 IBM SAN File System: a software for sharing file systems in SAN
 IBM 2145: System Storage SAN Volume Controller (SVC)
 IBM 9729: Optical Wavelength Division Multiplexer

Coprocessor units
 IBM 2938: Array processor; attach to 2044 (model 1) or 2165 (model 2)
 IBM 3092: IBM 3090 Processor controller
 IBM 3838: Array processor; 1976
 IBM 4758: PCI Cryptographic Coprocessor
 IBM 4764: PCI-X Cryptographic Coprocessor
 IBM 4765: PCIe Cryptographic Coprocessor
IBM 4767: PCIe Cryptographic Coprocessor (Crypto Express5S [CEX5S] on Z, MTM 4767–002, FC EJ32/EJ33 on Power)
 IBM 4768: PCIe Cryptographic Coprocessor (Crypto Express6S [CEX6S] on Z)
IBM 4769: PCIe Cryptographic Coprocessor (Crypto Express7S [CEX7S] on Z)

Input/output control units
 IBM 2820: Drum Storage Control Unit for 2301 Drum Storage Units
 IBM 2821: Control unit (for 2540 Reader/Punch and 1403 Printer)
 IBM 2822: Paper Tape Reader Control
 IBM 2835: Control unit model 1 (for 2305-1 Disk)
 IBM 2835: Control unit model 2 (for 2305-2 Disk)
 IBM 2841: DASD Control unit (for 2311, 2301, 2302, 2303, and 2321)
 IBM 2846: Channel controller for System/360 Model 67
 IBM 2860: Selector Channel (for SYS/360 2065 & above, 370/165, 168 and 195)
 IBM 2870: Multiplex Channel (for SYS/360 2065 & above, 370/165, 168 and 195)
 IBM 2880: Block Multiplex Channel (for 360/85 and 195, 370/165, 168, 195)
 IBM 3088: Multisystem channel communications unit
 IBM 3172: LAN Interconnect Controller (or Nways Interconnect Controller)
 IBM 4959: I/O expansion unit
 IBM 4987: Programmable communication subsystem
 IBM 5085: Graphics Processor. Part of IBM 5080 Graphics System.
 IBM 5088: Graphics Channel Controller. Part of IBM 5080 Graphics System.
 IBM 5209: 5250-3270 link protocol converter
 IBM 7299: Active Star Hub for twinax terminals
 IBM 7426: Terminal interface unit
 IBM 7621: Tape Control
 IBM 7909: Data Channel
 IBM 8102: Storage and I/O unit for 8100 Information System

Data communications devices
IBM 3270
 IBM 3178: Display station for IBM 3270
 IBM 3179: Display station (color or graphics) for IBM 3270
 IBM 3180: Monochrome display station, configurable to 80 columns (24, 32 or 43 rows), 132 columns (27 rows)
IBM 3191: Monochrome display station
 IBM 3192G: Terminal. 24 or 32 lines. Graphics.
 IBM 3193: Display station
 IBM 3194: Advanced function colour display
 IBM 3196: Display station
 IBM 3197: Color display work station
 IBM 3279: Color graphic terminal; 1979
 IBM 3290: Gas panel display terminal with 62x160 screen configurable with one to four logical screens, each of which could be further subdivided into partitions under software control; 1983
 IBM 3174: 3270 Subsystem controller
 IBM 3271: Remote 3270 control unit
 IBM 3272: Local 3270 control unit
 IBM 3274: 3270 Control unit
 IBM 3275: Display station
 IBM 3276: 3270 Control unit display station
 IBM 3277: Terminal
 IBM 3278: Display station
 IBM 3299: 3270 Terminal Multiplexer
 IBM 1009: IBM 1401/1440/1414/1460 Data Transmission Unit
 IBM 1013: Card Transmission Terminal
 IBM 1015: Inquiry/Display Terminal
 IBM 2210: NWays Multiprotocol Router (router)
 IBM 2217: NWays Multiprotocol Concentrator
 IBM 2250: Vector Graphics Display Terminal
 IBM 2260: CRT Terminal
IBM 2265: Display Station
 IBM 2701: Data Adapter Unit (communication controller)
 IBM 2702: Transmission Control (communication controller)
 IBM 2703: Transmission Control (communication controller)
 IBM 2740: Typewriter communication terminal; 1965
 IBM 2741: Typewriter communication terminal; 1965
 IBM 2770: Data Communications System; 1969
IBM 2772:  Multi-Purpose Control Unit: 1969
 IBM 2922: Programmable terminal; 1972
 IBM 2840: Display unit
 IBM 3101: ASCII display station
 IBM 3102: Thermal printer for attachment to IBM 3101, 3151, 3161, etc.
 IBM 3104: Display station for attachment to IBM 5250
 IBM 2840: Display Control Unit Model I for 2250 Model-II Analog Displays
 IBM 2840: Display Control Unit Model II for 2250 Model III Analog Displays
 IBM 2848: Display Controller (for 2260)
 IBM 3151: ASCII display station
 IBM 3161: ASCII display station
 IBM 3163: ASCII display station
 IBM 3164: ASCII color display station
 IBM 3192: Monochrome display station, configurable to 80 columns (24, 32 or 43 rows), 132 columns (27 rows). Record and playback keystrokes function. All configuration done through keyboard.
 IBM 3486: 3487, 3488 "Info Window" twinax displays
 IBM 3735: Programmable Buffered Terminal
 IBM 3767: Communication terminal
IBM 3780: Data communications terminal; 1972
IBM 3781: Card Punch (optional)
 IBM 3770: Data Communication system.  All Terminals came with integrated desk
IBM 3771: Communication Terminal Models 1, 2 and 3
IBM 3773: Communication Terminal Models 1, P1, 2, P2, 3 and P3
IBM 3774: Communication Terminal Models 1, P1, 2 and P2
IBM 3775: Communication Terminal Models 1 and P1
IBM 3776: Communication Terminal Models 1 and
IBM 3777: Communication Terminal Model 1
IBM 3783: Card Attachment Unit, attached 2502 or 3521 to any 3770 terminal except 3777
IBM 3784: Line Printer, optional second printer for the 3774
 IBM 7740: Communication control unit; 1963
 IBM 7750: Transmission Control Unit
 IBM 3704: Communication Controller
 IBM 3705: Communication Controller
 IBM 3708: Network control unit
 IBM 3710: Network Controller
 IBM 3720: Communication Controller
 IBM 3721: Expansion unit for IBM 3720
 IBM 3724: Controller
 IBM 3725: Communication Controller
 IBM 3728: Communication control matrix switch
 IBM 3745: High-speed communication controller; 1988. Model -410, more?
 IBM 3746: Multiprotocol Controller
 IBM 5250: CRT terminal; 1977
 IBM 5251: Display Station
 IBM 5252: Dual display CRT terminal; 1978
 IBM 7171: ASCII Device Attachment Control Unit (S/370 Channel-attached protocol converter for mapping ASCII display screens to IBM 3270 format)

Power supply/distribution units
 IBM 3089: IBM 3081/IBM 3090 Power controller. 50 Hz → 400 kHz

Modems
 IBM 3833: Modem; 1985
 IBM 3834: Modem; 1985
 IBM 3863: Modem
 IBM 3864: Modem
 IBM 3865: Modem
 IBM 3868: Rack-mounted modem
 IBM 5810: Limited-distance multi-modem enclosure (for 5811 and 5812)
 IBM 5811: Limited-distance modem
 IBM 5812: Limited-distance modem
 IBM 5841: 1,200-bit/s modem
 IBM 5842: 2,400-bit/s modem; 1986
 IBM 5865: Modem
 IBM 5866: Modem
 IBM 5868: Rack mounted modem

Other
 IBM 1210: Magnetic character-reader/sorter; 1959
 IBM 1219: Reader/sorter (to sort things like postal orders); 1961
 IBM 1230: Test Scoring
 IBM 1231: Optical Mark Page Reader
 IBM 1232: Optical Mark Page Reader
 IBM 1255: Magnetic character reader
 IBM 1259: Magnetic character reader
IBM 1270: Optical reader sorter
 IBM 1275: Optical reader sorter
 IBM 1285: IBM 1401/1440/1460/Sys360 Optical Reader for printed numbers
 IBM 1287: S/360 Optical Reader for handwritten numbers 
 IBM 1288: S/360 Optical Page Reader for hand written numbers and OCR-A Font
 IBM 1412: Magnetic character reader
 IBM 1418: IBM 1401/1460/Sys360—Optical Reader
 IBM 1419: IBM 1401/1410/Sys360—Magnetic Character Reader
 IBM 1428: IBM 1401/1460/Sys360—Optical Reader
IBM 1975: Optical Page Reader (Used at SSA from 1965 to 1977)
 IBM 2914: Switching unit
IBM 2956-2: Optical Mark/Hole Reader
 IBM 2956-3: Optical Mark/Hole Reader
 IBM 3017: Power and Coolant Distribution Unit (3031 processor complex)
 IBM 3027: Power and Coolant Distribution Unit (3032 processor complex)
 IBM 3037: Power and Coolant Distribution Unit (3033 processor complex)
 IBM 3087: Coolant Distribution Unit (308x processor complex)
 IBM 3097: Power and Coolant Distribution Unit (3090 processor complex)
 IBM 3117: Image scanner
 IBM 3118: Image scanner
 IBM 3540: Diskette I/O unit
IBM 3811: Control Unit for 3211
 IBM 3814: Switching Management System
 IBM 3881: Optical page reader
 IBM 3886: Optical character reader
 IBM 3890: Document processor
 IBM 3897: Image capture system
 IBM 3898: Image processor
 IBM 4577: System/88 expansion cabinet
 IBM 4964: Diskette unit
 IBM 4965: Diskette drive and I/O expansion unit
 IBM 4966: Diskette magazine unit
 IBM 4982: Sensor I/O unit
 IBM 4993: Series/1-S/370 termination enclosure
 IBM 4997: Rack enclosure
 IBM 5080: Graphics System; for System/370
 IBM 5085: Graphics Processor. Part of IBM 5080 Graphics System for System/370.
 IBM 5088: Graphics Channel Controller. Part of IBM 5080 Graphics System for System/370.
 IBM 5294: Remote control unit
 IBM 6090: High-end graphics system for the System/370
 IBM 7170: Device attachment control unit
 IBM 7770: Audio Response Unit
 IBM 7772: Audio Response Unit
 IBM 9037: Sysplex Timer

IBM PC components and peripherals
 IBM 2215: 15" Multisync Color Monitor with Digital Controls 65 kHz for Asia Pacific
IBM 4707: Monochrome monitor for Wheelwriter word processor
 IBM 5144: PC convertible monochrome display
 IBM 5145: PC convertible color display
 IBM 5151: IBM PC Display—Monochrome (green) CRT monitor, designed for MDA (1981)
 IBM 5152: IBM PC Graphics Printer (technically this was an Epson MX-80 dot matrix printer (1979) :File:Epson MX-80.jpg, but it was IBM-labelled (1981)
 IBM 5153: IBM PC Color Display—CRT monitor, designed for CGA (1983)
 IBM 5154: IBM Enhanced Color Display—for EGA (1984)
 IBM 5161: Expansion Unit for the IBM PC, a second chassis that was connected via ISA bus extender and receiver cards and a 60-pin cable connector; the Expansion Unit had its own power supply with enough wattage to drive up to two hard drives (the IBM 5150's original power supply was insufficient for hard drives) (1981–1987?)
 IBM 5173: PC Network baseband extender
 IBM 5175: IBM Professional Graphics Controller (PGC, PGA) (1984)
 IBM 5181: Personal Computer Compact Printer
 IBM 5182: Personal Computer Color Printer
 IBM 5201: Quietwriter Printer Model 2
 IBM 5202: Quietwriter III printer
 IBM 6312: PS/ValuePoint Color Display
 IBM 6314: PS/ValuePoint Color Display
 IBM 6317: Color display
 IBM 6319: PS/ValuePoint Color Display
 IBM 6324: Color display
 IBM 6325: Color display
 IBM 6327: Color display
 IBM 8503: Monochrome monitor for PC
 IBM 8507: PS/2 monochrome display
 IBM 8512: PS/2 color display
 IBM 8513: PS/2 color display
 IBM 8514: PS/2 large color display
 IBM 8514/A: Display adaptor
 IBM T220/T221 LCD monitors: 9503 Ultra-high resolution monitor
 IBM 9521: Monitor
 IBM 9524: Monitor
 IBM 9525: Monitor
 IBM 9527: Monitor
 IBM E74: CRT monitor, ca 2001
 IBM E74M: CRT monitor with built-in speakers and microphone (model no. 6517-U7N) ca 2001
 IBM PC keyboard (84 keys)(1981)
 IBM PC keyboard (101 keys) Enhanced (1984)
Monochrome Display Adapter (MDA)
 Color Graphics Adapter (CGA)
 Enhanced Graphics Adapter (EGA)
 Professional Graphics controller (PGC)
Multicolor Graphics Adapter (MCGA)
 Video Graphics Array (VGA)
 Micro Channel architecture (MCA): 32-bit expansion bus for PS/2
Mwave
 IBM DeskStar and TravelStar series of hard disk drives for desktops and laptops, respectively (Acquired by hard disk drive division of Hitachi)

Embedded systems, application-specific machines/systems

Airline reservation systems
 Deltamatic: Delta Air Lines reservations system
 PANAMAC: Pan American World Airways reservations system
Programmed Airline Reservations System (PARS): airline reservations system
 Sabre: reservations system, originally used by American Airlines
 IBM 9081: airlines version of the 3081
 IBM 9083: airlines version of the 3083
 IBM 9190: airlines version of the 3090

Bank and finance
 IBM 801: Proof Machine
 IBM 802: Proof Machine, 24 pockets
 IBM 803: Proof Machine, 32 pockets; 1949 to 1981, a product for 32 years!
 IBM 1201: Proof Inscriber. Proofing machine that was also an inscriber
 IBM 1202: Utility Inscriber, an electric type-writer, used to inscribe documents with magnetic ink
 IBM 1203: Unit Inscriber (keyoperated, print on checks, etc. with magnetic ink)
IBM 1206: Unit Inscriber (CMC-7 encoder)
 IBM 1240: Banking system; 1963
 IBM 1241: Bank Processing Unit
 IBM 1260: Electronic Inscriber (keyoperated for proving deposits, sorting and listing of checks)
 IBM 1420: High-speed Bank Transit System; 1962
 IBM 1450: Data Processing System for small banks; 1968
 IBM 2730: Transaction validation terminal; 1971
 IBM 2984: Cash dispensing terminal; 1972
 IBM 3600: Finance Communication System; 1973
IBM 3601: Branch Controller
 IBM 3602: Branch Controller
 IBM 3604: Teller Terminal (Keyboard/Magnetic Swipe/Display/Optional PINpad)
 IBM 3606: Teller Terminal (Keyboard/Magnetic Swipe/Display)
 IBM 3608: Printer with Keyboard and Display
 IBM 3609: Printer
 IBM 3610: Document Printer
 IBM 3611: Passbook Printer
 IBM 3612: Document/Passbook Printer
 IBM 3613: Journal Printer
 IBM 3614: Automatic teller machine (ATM aka CTF); 1973
 IBM 3615: Administrative Printer
 IBM 3616: Journal Printer
IBM 3618: Administrative Line Printer (155 lpm, first IBM band printer)
 IBM 3619: Line Printer ('Australian' administrative printer version)
 IBM 3620: Magnetic Stripe Reader Encoder and Journal/Document Printer
 IBM 3621: Statement Printer with Magnetic Stripe Reader and optional Keyboard/PINpad
 IBM 3624: Through-the-wall ATM; 1979
 IBM 3670: Brokerage communications system; 1971
 IBM 3895: Deposit processing system; 1978
 IBM 4700: Branch Banking Equipment; 1981
IBM 4701: Branch Controller (8" floppy disc)
 IBM 4702: Branch Controller (5¼" HD floppy disc; hard disc)
 IBM 4704: Teller Terminal (Keyboard/Magnetic Swipe/Display/Optional PINpad)
 IBM 4710: Journal/Cutform Printer
 IBM 4712: Journal/Cutform Printer
 IBM 4713: Verification Printer
 IBM 4715: Printer
 IBM 4720: Cutform/Passbook Printer
 IBM 4722: Passbook Printer
 IBM 4723: Document Processor
 IBM 4730: Counter-style Personal Banking Machine (PBM); 1983
 IBM 4731: In-lobby PBM; 1983
 IBM 4732: In-lobby PBM; 1987
 IBM 4736: Cash-only PBM
 IBM 4737: Self-service transaction station
 IBM 4781: Table Top ATM; 1991 (re-badged Diebold 1060)
 IBM 4782: In-lobby ATM; 1991 (re-badged Diebold 1062)
 IBM 4783: Cash-only ATM; 1991 (re-badged Diebold 1064)
 IBM 4785: Exterior ATM; 1991 (re-badged Diebold 1072)
 IBM 4786: Exterior Cash-only ATM; 1991 (re-badged Diebold 1071)
 IBM 4787: Exterior Drive-up ATM; 1991 (re-badged Diebold 1073)
 IBM 4788: Exterior Self-standing Cash-only ATM; 1991 (re-badged Diebold 1074)
 IBM 4789: Cash-only ATM; 1991 (re-badged Diebold 1063)
 IBM 5922: Low-speed magnetic ink character recognition (MICR) Reader
 IBM 5995: Branch Controller

Computer-aided drafting (CAD)
 IBM 7361: Fastdraft System; 1982, a low-cost drafting system using a light pen and a CRT screen
 IBM 7361: Graphics Processor Unit
 IBM 3251: Graphics Display Station Model 2

Document processing
 IBM MT/ST: Magnetic Tape/Selectric Typewriter; 1964
 IBM MC/ST: Magnetic Card/Selectric Typewriter (Mag Card); 1969
 IBM 1282: Optical reader card punch 
 IBM 1287: Optical reader; 1966
 IBM 1288: Optical Page reader
IBM 2956-5: Document Processor (RPQ W19976)
 IBM 3740: Data entry system; 1973
 IBM 3741: Data Station Models 1 and 2, Programmable Work Stations Models 3 and 4
IBM 3742: Dual Data Station
IBM 3713: Printer
IBM 3715: Printer
IBM 3717: Printer
 IBM 3747: Data Converter
IBM 3540 Diskette Input/Output Unit
 IBM 3694: Document Processor; 1980
IBM 3881: Optical mark reader; 1972
 IBM 3886: Optical character reader; 1972
 IBM 3890: Document Processor; 1973
 IBM 3891: Document Processor; 1989
 IBM 3892: Document Processor; 1987
 IBM 3895: Document Reader/Inscriber; 1977
 IBM 5321: Mag Card Unit for System/32; 1976
 IBM 6640: Document printer; 1976; in 1977 reassigned being part of the Office System/6
 IBM Displaywriter System Work Station; 1980 
IBM 6360: IBM Displaywriter: Diskette Unit
 IBM 6361: IBM Displaywriter: Mag Card Unit
IBM 6580: IBM Displaywriter: Display Station
 IBM 9370: Document reproducer; 1966
IBM Office System/6
IBM 6/420: stand-alone information processing unit; part of the Office System/6; 1978
IBM 6/430: information processor; part of the Office System/6; 1977
IBM 6/440: information processor; part of the Office System/6; 1977
IBM 6/442: information processor; part of the Office System/6; 1978
IBM 6/450: information processor; part of the Office System/6; 1977
IBM 6/452: information processor; part of the Office System/6; 1978

Educational
 IBM 1500: Computer-assisted instruction system; 1966
 IBM 1510: Display Console
 IBM 1512: Image Projector

Government: avionics, computation, command and control, and space systems
 IBM Relay Calculator: aka The IBM Pluggable Sequence Relay Calculator (Aberdeen Machine), 1944 
IBM NORC: Naval Ordnance Research Calculator; 1954
AN/FSQ-7: computer for the Semi-Automatic Ground Environment; 1959 (IBM had the manufacturing contract)
IBM 728: Magnetic Tape Reader/Recorder (7 Track—6 data bits & 1 synchronization bit; 248 Characters/inch)
 AN/FSQ-8 Combat Control Central: variant of the AN/FSQ-7
AN/FSQ-31V: US Air Force Command and Control Data Processing Element for SACCS; 1959–1960
IBM 4020: IBM id for the AN/FSQ-31V
 AN/FSQ-32: SAGE Solid State Computer
 IBM 2361: NASA's Manned Spacecraft Center IBM 7094 II Core Storage Unit (524288—36-bit words); 1964
 ASC-15 Titan II Guidance Computer
 Gemini Guidance Computer
 Saturn Guidance Computer
 Saturn instrument unit
 IBM System/4 Pi: avionics computers; military and NASA; 1967
 Skylab Onboard Computers
 Space Shuttle General Purpose Computer
 AN/ASQ-155 computer
 IBM RAD6000: Radiation-hardened single board computer, based on the IBM RISC Single Chip CPU
 ASCI White Supercomputer: Built as stage three of the Accelerated Strategic Computing Initiative (ASCI) started by the U.S. Department of Energy and the National Nuclear Security Administration
 IBM 7950: Cryptanalytic computer using 7030 as CPU; 1962 (Harvest)
IBM 7951: IBM 7950 Stream coprocessor
 IBM 7952: IBM 7950 High performance core storage (1024—72-bit words: 64 data bits & 8 ECC bits)
 IBM 7955: IBM 7950 Tractor Magnetic tape system (22 Track—16 data bits & 6 ECC bits; 2,400 words/inch)
 IBM 7959: IBM 7950 High-speed I/O exchange
 IBM 9020: for FAA and one system for the UK CAA.
IBM 7201: enhanced 2065 (S/360-65) used as a Computing Element (CE) in the IBM 9020 complex
IBM 7231: enhanced 2050 (S/360-50) used as an Input Output Control Element (IOCE) in the IBM 9020 complex
IBM 7251: 512KiB (byte = 8 bits + P) core Storage Element (SE) used in the IBM 9020 complex
IBM 7289-02: Peripheral Adapter Module (PAM) used in the IBM 9020 complex
IBM 7289-04: Display Element (DE) used in the IBM 9020 complex
IBM 7262: System Console (SC) used in the IBM 9020 complex
IBM 7265: Configuration Console (CC) used in the IBM 9020 complex

Industry and manufacturing
 IBM 357: Data Collection system; 1959
  IBM 013: Badge Punch
  IBM 024/026: Card Punch (81 col)
  IBM 357: Input Station (Badge and/or serial card reader)
  IBM 358: Input Control Unit 
  IBM 360: Clock Read-Out Control
  IBM 361: Read-Out Clock
  IBM 372: Manual Entry
  IBM 373: Punch Switch
  IBM 374: Cartridge Reader
 IBM 1001: Data transmission system; 1960
 IBM 1030: Data Collection system; 1963
 IBM 1031: Input Station.
 IBM 1032: Digital Time Unit.
 IBM 1033: Printer.
 IBM 1034: Card Punch
 IBM 1035: Badge Reader
 IBM 1050: Data Communications System; 1963
IBM 1026: Transmission Control Unit
 IBM 1051: Central Control Unit
 IBM 1052: Printer-Keyboard, based on Selectric mechanism
 IBM 1053: Console Printer, based on Selectric mechanism
 IBM 1054: Paper Tape Reader
 IBM 1055: Paper Tape Punch
 IBM 1057: Punched Card Output
 IBM 1058: Printing Card Punch Output
 IBM 1092: Programmed Keyboard (keyboard storage for input to 1050)
 IBM 1093: Programmed Keyboard (used in tandem with 1092 for transmission to 24/26 or 7770)
 IBM 1060: Data Communications System
 IBM 1026: Transmission Control Unit
 IBM 1070: Process Communication System; 1964
 IBM 1026: IBM 1030/1050/1060/1070 Transmission Control Unit
 IBM 1071: Terminal Control Unit
 IBM 1072: Terminal Multiplexer
 IBM 1073: Latching Contact Operate Model 1
 IBM 1073: Counter Terminal Model 2
 IBM 1073: Digital-Pulse Converter Model 3
 IBM 1074: Binary Display
 IBM 1075: Decimal Display
 IBM 1076: Manual Binary Input
 IBM 1077: Manual Decimal Input
 IBM 1078: Pulse Counter
 IBM 1080: Data Acquisition System
 IBM 1081: DAS Control...for analytical applications
 IBM 1082: Punched Card Input
 IBM 1083: Remote Control (provides Operator Scan Request)
 IBM 1084: Sampler Reader (Technicon Sampler 40)
 IBM 1055: Paper Tape Punch
 IBM 1057: Punched Card Output
 IBM 1058: Printing Card Punch Output
 IBM 1710: Control system based on IBM 1620; 1961
 IBM 1620: IBM 1710 Central Processing Unit
 IBM 1711: IBM 1710 Data Converter (A/D)
 IBM 1712: IBM 1710 Multiplexer and Terminal Unit
 IBM 1720: Control system based on IBM 1620; 1961
IBM 1800: Process control variant of the IBM 1130; 1964
 IBM 2790: Data Communications System; 1969
 IBM 2715: Transmission controller
 IBM 2791: Area Station
 IBM 2793: Area Station
 IBM 2795: Data Entry Unit
 IBM 2796: Data Entry Unit
IBM 2797: Data Entry Unit
IBM 2798: Guided Display Unit
 IBM 3630: Plant Communications System; 1978
 IBM 3730: Distributed office communication system; 1978
 IBM Series/1: brand name for process control computers; 1976
 IBM 4953: Series/1 processor model 3; 1976
 IBM 4954: Series/1 processor model 4
 IBM 4955: Series/1 processor model 5; 1976
 IBM 4956: Series/1 processor model 6
 IBM 5010: System/7 processor; industrial control; 1970
IBM 5012: Multifunction Module
IBM 5013: Digital Input/Output Module
IBM 5014: Analog Input Module
IBM 5022: Disk Storage Unit
IBM 5025 Enclosure
IBM 5028: Operator Station
IBM 5010E: System/7 Maritime Application/Bridge System; 1974
IBM 5090: N01 Radar Navigation Interface Module
IBM 5090: N02 Bridge Console
IBM 5026: C03 Enclosure (vibration hardened)
IBM 5230: Data Collection system;
IBM 5231: Controller Models 1,2, and 3
IBM 5234: Time Entry Station Models 1 and 2
IBM 5235: Data Entry Station
IBM 5230: Data Collection System Accessory Package
 IBM 5275: Direct Numerical Control Station; 1973
 IBM 5531: Industrial computer for plant environments; 1984
IBM 5937: Industrial Terminal; 1976
 IBM 7531: Industrial computer; 1985
 IBM 7532: Industrial computer; 1985
 IBM 7535: Industrial robotic system; 1982
 IBM 7552: Industrial computer; 1986
 IBM 7565: Industrial robotic system; 1982
 IBM 7700: Data Acquisition System, not marketed; 1964
 IBM 9003: Industrial computer; 1985

Medical/science/lab equipment
 IBM 2991: Blood cell separator; 1972; model 2 1976
 IBM 2997: Blood cell separator; 1977
 IBM 5880: Electrocardiograph system; 1978
 IBM 9630: Gas chromograph; 1985

Research/advertising (not product) machines 
 IBM Columbia Difference Tabulator: 1931
 IBM ASCC: Automatic Sequence Controlled Calculator (aka. Harvard Mark I); 1944
 IBM SSEC: Selective Sequence Electronic Calculator; 1948
 IBM Deep Blue: Chess playing computer developed for 1997 match with Garry Kasparov
 IBM Watson: An artificially intelligent computer system capable of answering questions posed in natural language, specifically developed to answer questions on the quiz show Jeopardy!.

Retail/point-of-sale (POS)
 IBM 3650: Retail Store System; 1973
IBM 3651: Store Controller Model A50 or B50
IBM 3653: Point of Sale Terminal
IBM 3657: Ticket Unit
IBM 3659: Remote Communications Unit
IBM 3784: Line Printer 
 IBM 3660: Supermarket System; 1973
IBM 3651: Store Controller Model A60 or B60
IBM 3661: Store Controller 
 IBM 3663: Supermarket Terminal ; 1973
IBM 3666 Checkout Scanner
IBM 3669: Store Communications Unit
 IBM 4610: SureMark Retail Printer 
 IBM 4683: PC Based Retail System; 1987
 IBM 4693: PC Based Retail System
 IBM 4694: PC Based Retail System
 IBM SurePOS 300: Cost effective PC Based Retail System 
 IBM SurePOS 500: All in one PC Based Retail System 
 IBM SurePOS 700: High performance PC Based Retail System 
 IBM SureOne: PC Based Retail System
 AnyPlace POS: Customer touch screen Kiosk 
 BART (Bay Area Rapid Transport)  fare collection machines; 1972

Telecommunications
 International Time Recording Co. Series 970: Telephone System (1930s)
 SAIS (Semi-Automatic Intercept System): Added automated custom intercept messages to the Bell System's operator-based centralized intercept system, using a computer-controlled magnetic drum audio playback medium. Late 1960s.
 IBM 1750: Switching System
 IBM 1755: Operator station
 IBM 2750: Switching System
 IBM 3750: Switching System
 IBM 3755: Operator Desk
IBM 8750: Business Communications System (ROLM)
 IBM 9750: Business Communications System (ROLM)
 IBM 9751: CBX: Main component of 9750 system
 IBM Simon: Smartphone; 1994

Unclassified

IBM TouchMobile a hand-held computer announced in 1993

Computer software
Some software listings are for software families, not products (Fortran was not a product; Fortran H was a product).

Some IBM software products were distributed free (no charge for the software itself, a common practice early in the industry). The term "Program Product" was used by IBM to denote that it's freely available but not for free. Prior to June 1969, the majority of software packages written by IBM were available at no charge to IBM customers; with the June 1969 announcement, new software not designated as "System Control Programming" became Program Products, although existing non-system software remained available for free.

Operating systems
 AIX, IBM's family of proprietary UNIX OS's (Advanced Interactive eXecutive) on multiple platforms
 BPS/360 (Basic Programming Support/360)
 BOS/360 (Basic Operating System/360)
 TOS/360 (Tape Operating System/360)
 DM2, Disk Monitor System Version 2 for the IBM 1130
 DOS/360 (Disk Operating System/360)
 DOS/VS (Disk Operating System/Virtual Storage—370), virtual memory successor to DOS/360
 DOS/VSE (Virtual Storage Extended—370, 4300)
 VSE/AF (VSE/Advanced Functions) enhancements to DOS/VSE
 VSE/SP (VSE/System Package), integrates DOS/VSE, VSE/AF and other products, replaces SSX/VSE
 VSE/ESA (Virtual Storage Extended/Enterprise System Architecture), replaces VSE/SP
 z/VSE for z/Architecture
 DPCX (Distributed Processing Control eXecutive) for IBM 8100
 DPPX (Distributed Processing Programming eXecutive) for IBM 8100 and, later, the ES/9370
 CPF (Control Program Facility) for the System/38
 IBM i, previously i5/OS and OS/400, successor to CPF for AS/400, IBM Power Systems, and PureSystems
 IBSYS/IBJOB (IBM 7090/94 operating system)
 IX/370 An IBM proprietary UNIX OS (Interactive eXecutive for IBM System/370)
 Model 44 Programming System for the System/360 Model 44
 OS/360 (Operating System/360 for IBM System/360)
 PCP (Primary Control Program option)
 MFT (Multiprogramming with a Fixed number of Tasks option)
 MVT (Multiprogramming with a Variable number of Tasks option)
 M65MP (Model 65 Multiprocessor option)
 OS/VS1 (Operating System—Virtual Storage 1) for IBM System/370, virtual memory successor to MFT
 OS/VS2 (Operating System—Virtual Storage 2) for IBM System/370, virtual memory successor to MVT
SVS: Release 1 (Single Virtual Storage)
 MVS: Release 2–3.8 (Multiple Virtual address Spaces)
 MVS/370 (OS/VS2 2.0-3.8, MVS/SE, MVS/SP V1)
 MVS/SE: MVS System Extensions
 Release 1: based on OS/VS2 R3.7 plus selectable units
 Release 2: based on OS/VS2 R3.8 plus selectable units
 MVS/SP V1: MVS/System Product, replacement for MVS/SE
 MVS/XA (Multiple Virtual Systems—Extended Architecture): MVS/SP V2
 MVS/ESA (Multiple Virtual Systems—Enterprise Systems Architecture)
 MVS/SP V3
 MVS/ESA SP V4
 MVS/ESA SP V5
 OS/390, successor to MVS/ESA for IBM System/390
 z/OS, successor to OS/390 for z/Architecture and, up through Version 1.5, System/390
 OS/2 (Operating System/2) for the IBM PS/2 and other x86 systems
 PC DOS (Personal Computer Disk Operating System)
 System Support Program for System/34, System/36
 Transaction Processing Facility (TPF), formerly IBM Airline Control Program (ACP)
 z/TPF, successor to TPF
 TSS/360 (Time Sharing System, a failed predecessor to VM/CMS, intended for the IBM System/360 Model 67)
 CP-67 May refer to either a package for the 360/67 or only to the Control program of that package.
 CP/CMS Another name for the CP-67 package for the 360/67; predecessor to VM.
 VM, sometimes called VM/CMS (Virtual Machine/Conversational Monitor System) Successor systems to CP-67 for the S/370 and later machines. First appeared as Virtual Machine Facility/370 and most recently as z/VM.
 VM/SE Virtual Machine/System Extension, also known as System Extension Program Product (SEPP). An enhancement to Virtual Machine Facility/370, replaced by VM/SP.
 VM/BSE Virtual Machine/Basic System Extension, also known as Basic System Extension Program Product (BSEPP). An enhancement to Virtual Machine Facility/370, providing some of the facilities of VM/se, replaced by VM/SP.
 VM/SP Virtual Machine/System Product, replacing VM/SE and the base for all future VM versions.
 VM/XA Virtual Machine/Extended Architecture 31-bit VM
 VM/XA MF (Virtual machine/Extended architecture Migration Aid)
 VM/XA SF (Virtual Machine/Extended Architecture Systems Facility), successor to VM/XA SF
 VM/XA SP (Virtual Machine/Extended Architecture Systems Product), successor to VM/XA SF
 VM/ESA (Virtual Machine/Enterprise System Architecture), successor to VM/XA
 z/VM, successor to VM/ESA
 4690 OS (retail)

Utilities and languages
 A20 handler for the PC (address line 20 handler)
 Ada
 ALGOL 60
 ALGOL F compiler for OS/360
 APL
 IBM APL implementations
 IBM APL2 implementations
 Autocoder macro assemblers for various machines, with nothing in common but the name
 COBOL
 IBM COBOL compilers
 IBM Compilers (formerly VisualAge compilers (C/C++, Fortran, Java, et al.))
 CSP (Cross System Product)
 Eclipse an IDE
 EGL (Enterprise Generation Language)
 FARGO (Fourteen-o-one Automatic Report Generation Operation). Predecessor of RPG for the IBM 1401
 FAP assembler for the IBM 709, 7090, and 7094 (FORTRAN Assembly Program)
 FORTRAN  (originally developed by IBM for the 704) (FORmula TRANslator)
 Generalized Markup Language A document markup language, part of Document Composition Facility (DCF)
 IBM Information Access Gave customers access to the Retain and PTF databases, circa 1981
 ISPF Interactive System Productivity Facility. An IDE for MVS and z/OS systems
 JCL batch job language for OS/360 and successors
 JES1, JES2 and JES3, job entry and spooling subsystems
 MAP (Macro Assembly Program in the IBJOB component of IBSYS)
 Pascal
 PL/I (Programming Language/One)
 PL/I F compiler for OS/360 and PL/I D compiler for DOS/360
 PL/I Optimizing Compiler and PL/I Checkout Compiler
 IBM Enterprise PL/I
 IBM PL/I for OS/2, AIX, Linux, and z/OS
 PL/S (Programming Language/Systems), originally named BSL (Basic Systems Language), later PL/AS, PL/X
 POWER spooler for DOS/360 and successors (Program Output Writers and Execution Readers)
 REXX scripting language (REstructured eXtended eXecutor)
 RPG (Report Program Generator)
 RPG for IBM 1401 and System/360
 RPG II for System/3, System/32, System/34, System/36, and System/370
 RPG III for System/38, its successor AS/400, and System/370
 RPG IV for RISC AS/400 and other machines running IBM i
 SOAP (Symbolic Optimal Assembly Program for IBM 650)
 Script A document markup language
 SCRIPT component of CP/CMS
 SCRIPT/370
 SCRIPT/VS Component of Document Composition Facility (DCF)
 SCRIPT/PC A subset of SCRIPT running under PC DOS
 SPS (Symbolic Programming System). An assembler for IBM 1401 or IBM 1620 systems, less capable than Autocoder
 VFU (Vocabulary File Utility) for IBM 7772
 XEDIT an editor for VM/CMS systems

Middleware and applications
IBM distributes its diverse collection of software products over several brands; mainly:
 IBM's own branding for many software products originally developed in-house;
 Lotus: collaboration and communication;
 Rational: software development and maintenance;
 Tivoli: management, operations, and Cloud; 
 WebSphere: Internet. 
Watson Main article: IBM Watson

9PAC Report generator for the IBM 7090 (709 PACkage)
 IBM Administrative Terminal System (ATS) Online Text Entry, Editing, Processing, Storage and Retrieval
 IBM Advanced Text Management System (ATMS) A CICS-based successor to ATS, ATMS served as the text entry system for STorage And Retrieval System (STAIRS)
 IBM Assistant Series (Filing Assistant, Reporting Assistant, Graphing Assistant, Writing Assistant and Planning Assistant)
 IBM Audio Distribution System
 IBM BS12 (IBM Business System 12)
 IBM CICS (Customer Information Control System)
 IBM CICS Transaction Gateway
 IBM CICS Web interpreter, IBM OD390
 IBM Cloudscape Pure Java Database Server. Now open source Apache Derby
 IBM Cognos Business Intelligence Business Intelligence Suite
 IBM Concurrent Copy, backup software
 IBM Content Manager OnDemand (CMOD)
 IBM Db2 Relational DBMS (DataBase 2)
 IBM DB2 Content Manager
 IBM DB2 Document Manager
 IBM DB2 Records Manager
 IBM Deep Computing Visualization for Linux V1.2
 IBM DISOSS Distributed Office Support System
 IBM Document Composition Facility (DCF); includes SCRIPT/VS
 IBM Document Library Facility (DLF)
 IBM BookMaster 
 IBM BookManager
 IBM FileNet products, P8 Business Process Management and Enterprise Content Management (FileNet bought by IBM)
 IBM Graphical Data Display Manager (GDDM).
 IBM Generalized Information System (GIS).
 IBM HTTP Server
 IBM Information Management System (IMS) Hierarchical database management system (DBMS)
 IBM Informix Dynamic Server
 IBM Lotus cc:Mail
 IBM Lotus Connections
 IBM Lotus Expeditor
 IBM Lotus QuickPlace
 IBM Lotus Quickr
 IBM Lotus Notes (Lotus Development was bought by IBM in 1995)
 IBM Lotus Sametime
 IBM Lotus SmartSuite Office Suite
 IBM Lotus Symphony Office Suite
 IBM Maximo Asset Management
 IBM Network Design and Analysis (NETDA)
 IBM Network Performance Monitor (NPM)
 IBM OfficeVision (originally named PROFS)
 IBM OMEGAMON
 IBM Personal Communications Emulator, also known as Host Access Client
 IBM Planning Analytics
 IBM Print Management Facility (PMF)
 IBM Print Services Facility (PSF)
 IBM QualityStage Acquired from Ascential
 Rational Software's products (Rational bought by IBM in 2003)
 IBM Rational Application Developer
 IBM Rational Software Architect
 IBM Rational System Architect
 IBM Rational Asset Manager
 IBM Rational Automation Framework Previously known as IBM Rational Automation Framework for WebSphere
 IBM Red Brick Database Server
 IBM RFID Information Center (RFIDIC) Tracking and tracing products through supply chains
 IBM Screen Definition Facility II (SDF II), a software tool for the interactive development of screen definition panels.
 IBM SearchManager text search, successor to STAIRS
 IBM Security Key Lifecycle Manager
 IBM Softek TDMF
 IBM STorage And Information Retrieval System (STAIRS) Text search
 IBM Sterling B2B Integrator
 IBM Teleprocessing Network Simulator (TPNS)
 IBM Tivoli Access Manager (TAM)
 IBM Tivoli Application Dependency Discovery Manager (TADDM)
 IBM Tivoli Asset Manager for IT (TAMIT)
 IBM Tivoli Framework (Tivoli Systems was bought by IBM in 1995)
 IBM Tivoli Change and Configuration Management Database (CCMDB)
 IBM Tivoli Compliance Insight Manager (TCIM)
 IBM Tivoli Monitoring
 IBM Tivoli Netview
 IBM Tivoli Netcool
 IBM Tivoli Provisioning Manager
 IBM Tivoli Service Automation Manager
 IBM Tivoli Storage Manager (Formerly ADSM, moved to Tivoli in 1999)
 IBM Tivoli Storage Manager FastBack
 IBM Tivoli Workload Scheduler
 IBM Tivoli System Automation
 IBM U2, including IBM UniVerse and IBM UniData Dimensional database DBMS
 IBM ViaVoice Dictation (early version: IBM VoiceType)
 IBM Virtualization Engine
 IBM VSPC
 IBM WebSphere
 IBM WebSphere Application Server
 IBM WebSphere Adapters
 IBM Websphere Business Events
 IBM WebSphere Banking Transformation Toolkit
 IBM Websphere Host On-Demand (HOD) Host On-Demand Web-based TN3270, TN5250 and VT440 Terminal Emulation.
 IBM WebSphere Message Broker
 IBM WebSphere MQ (previously known as IBM MQSeries)
 IBM WebSphere Portal
 IBM WebSphere Portlet Factory
 IBM WebSphere Process Server
 WebSphere Service Registry and Repository
 IBM Worklight (Mobile application platform)
 IBM Workplace Web Content Management (IWWCM) Web content management for WebSphere Portal and Domino servers (Presence Online dba Aptrix bought by IBM in 2003)
 IBM Works Office suite for OS/2
 IBM Z Operational Log and Data Analytics
 IBM Z Anomaly Analytics with Watson
 IBM z/OS Workload Interaction Navigator
 TOURCast
 CoScripter
 ICCF Interactive Computing and Control Facility. An interactive editor that runs under CICS on DOS/VSE. Now included as part of "VSE Central Functions."
 NCCF Network Communications Control Facility. A network monitoring and control subsystem

Watson Customer Engagement 
The Watson Customer Engagement (commonly known as WCE and formerly known as IBM Commerce) business unit supports marketing, commerce, and supply chain software development and product offerings for IBM. Software and solutions offered as part of these three portfolios by WCE are as follows:

Watson Marketing Portfolio 
 Watson Campaign Automation
 IBM Tealeaf
 IBM Campaign
 Customer Experience Analytics
 Watson Marketing Insights
 IBM Journey Designer
 Watson Real-Time Personalization
 Watson Content Hub

Watson Commerce 
 IBM Configure, Price, Quote
 IBM Digital Commerce
 IBM WebSphere Commerce
 Watson Commerce Insights
 IBM Order Management
 IBM Store Engagement
 Watson Order Optimizer
 IBM Call Center
 IBM Inventory Visibility
 IBM Watson Pay
 IBM Payment Gateway
 IBM Dynamic Pricing
 IBM Price Optimization
 IBM Price Management
 IBM Markdown Optimization
 Forms Experience Builder

Watson Supply Chain 
 IBM Supply Chain Business Network
 IBM Connect:Direct
 IBM Supply Chain Insights
 IBM B2B Integration Portfolio
 IBM Strategic Supply Management

Data centers

 Portable Modular Data Center
 Scalable Modular Data Center

Services
 Call/360 timesharing service (1968)
 IBM's service bureau business: an in-house service, offered until 1957. See SBC, below.
 Silverpop, an Atlanta-based software company
 Service Bureau Corporation (SBC) was a subsidiary of IBM formed in 1957 to operate IBM's former service bureau business as an independent company. In 1973 sold to Control Data Corporation.

See also
 IBM Product Center
 History of IBM magnetic disk drives
 History of hard disk drives
 OS/360 and successors
 :Category:IBM products

Notes

References

External links

 IBM Mainframe Family tree & chronology
 IBM Storage basic information sources
 IBM Offering Information

products
IBM
IBM